= List of teams and cyclists in the 2015 Tour de France =

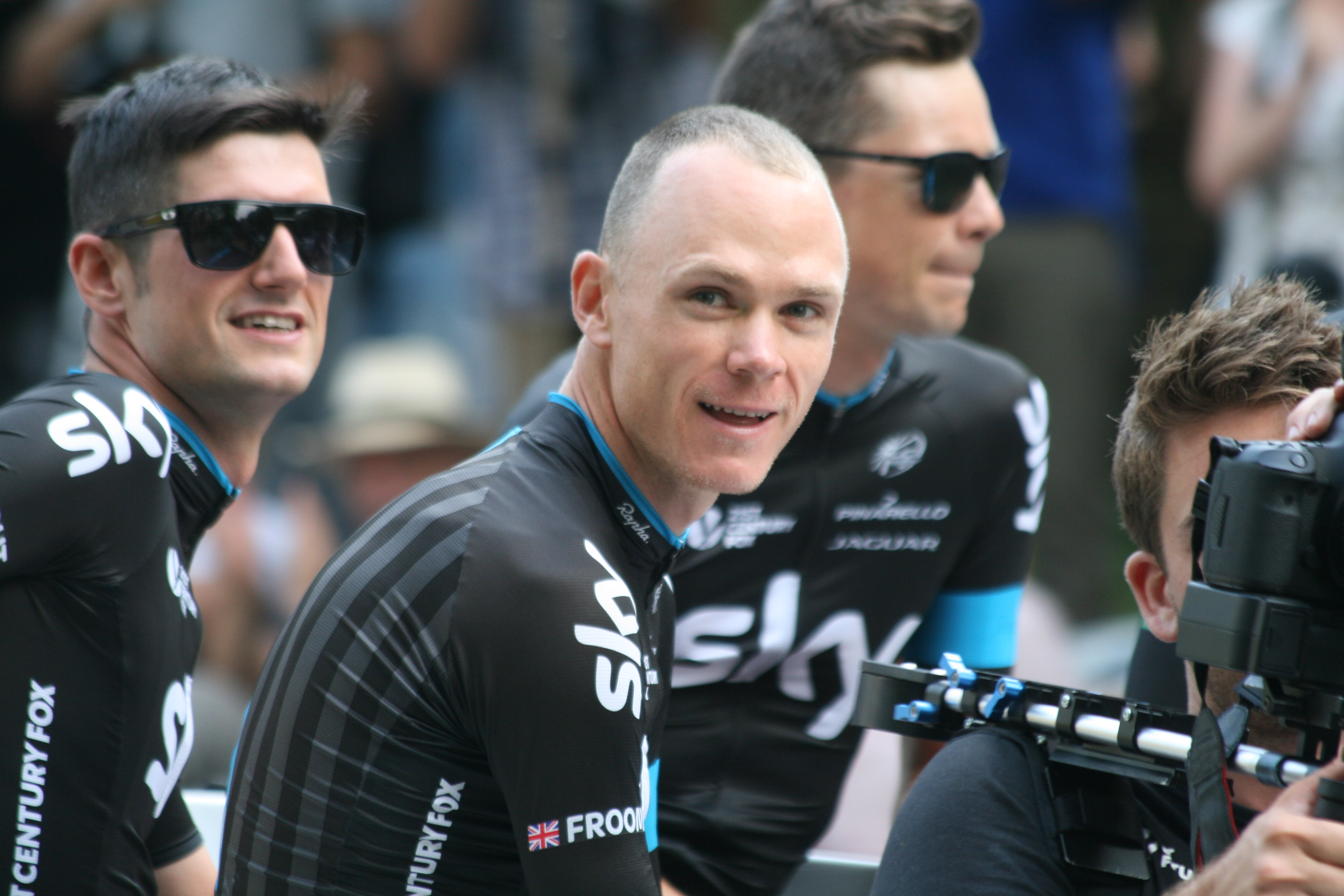
Chris Froome, winner of the 2015 Tour de France, with other members of Team Sky at the presentation before the first stage in Utrecht.

The 2015 Tour de France was the 102nd edition of the race, one of cycling's Grand Tours. The race took place from 4 July to 26 July 2015, starting in Utrecht in the Netherlands and finishing on the Champs-Élysées in Paris.

All seventeen UCI WorldTeams were automatically invited and were obliged to attend the race. In January 2015, five UCI Professional Continental teams were given wildcard places into the race by the race organisers – Amaury Sport Organisation (ASO) – to complete the 22-team peloton. Among the wildcard teams was MTN–Qhubeka, the first African trade team to participate in the Tour. As each team was entitled to enter nine riders, the peloton on the first stage consisted of 198 riders. These came from 32 countries. 41 riders – approximately a fifth of the peloton – were French; no other nation had more than 20 riders in the race. Merhawi Kudus and Daniel Teklehaimanot were the first ever Eritrean riders to participate in the Tour.

The number of riders per nation participated in the 2015 Tour de France: 20+ / 10–19 / 2–9 / 1

160 riders completed the final stage in Paris, with 38 of the riders failing to finish the race. The race was won by Chris Froome (Team Sky), the champion from the 2013 Tour. Froome first took the lead of the race following the third stage – the first uphill finish of the race. He lost the yellow jersey of the race leader to Tony Martin (Etixx–Quick-Step) at the end of the fourth stage, but Martin's withdrawal from the race after a crash at the end of the sixth stage put Froome back into the lead. He extended this lead during the stages in the Pyrenees and defended it successfully against attacks from Nairo Quintana (Movistar Team) during the final stages that took place in the Alps. Quintana finished second, 1 minute and 12 seconds behind Froome, with Quintana's teammate Alejandro Valverde in third. Quintana won the competition for the best young rider. The points classification was won for the fourth consecutive year by Peter Sagan (Tinkoff–Saxo), although he failed to win any stages during the race. As well as winning the general classification, Froome won the mountains classification, while Movistar won the team classification.

== Teams ==
The 17 UCI WorldTeams were automatically invited to participate in the Tour. In addition, Amaury Sport Organisation (ASO), the race organisers, invited five wildcard teams. Three of the teams (Team Europcar, Cofidis and Bretagne–Séché Environnement) were prominent French teams. The race director, Christian Prudhomme, pointed to Europcar's strength as a team and the presence of several prominent French riders and to Cofidis's Nacer Bouhanni as reasons for their inclusion. He also recalled Bretagne–Séché Environnement's performance in 2014 and the team's base in Brittany, a region used by the 2015 race. Bora–Argon 18 had also performed strongly in 2014 and, as a German-based team, their presence was important as ASO had recently signed a new broadcast agreement with ARD, a German broadcaster. The final team to be invited was MTN–Qhubeka, who made their debut in the Tour and were the first African trade team ever to participate in the race. Prudhomme explained that their invitation was part of ASO's strategy to build cycling's popularity in Africa.

UCI WorldTeams

- Astana (riders)
- AG2R La Mondiale (riders)
- FDJ (riders)
- Team Sky (riders)
- Tinkoff–Saxo (riders)
- Movistar Team (riders)
- BMC Racing Team (riders)
- Lotto–Soudal (riders)
- Team Giant–Alpecin (riders)
- Team Katusha (riders)
- Orica–GreenEDGE (riders)
- Etixx–Quick-Step (riders)
- LottoNL–Jumbo (riders)
- Trek Factory Racing (riders)
- Lampre–Merida (riders)
- Cannondale–Garmin (riders)
- IAM Cycling (riders)

UCI Professional Continental teams

- Team Europcar (riders)
- Cofidis (riders)
- Bora–Argon 18 (riders)
- Bretagne–Séché Environnement (riders)
- MTN–Qhubeka (riders)

== Cyclists ==
Legend
No.	Starting number worn by the rider during the Tour
Pos.	Position in the general classification
Time	Deficit to the winner of the general classification
‡	Denotes riders born on or after 1 January 1990 eligible for the young rider classification
General classification	Denotes the winner of the general classification
Points classification	Denotes the winner of the points classification
Mountains classification	Denotes the winner of the mountains classification
Young rider classification	Denotes the winner of the young rider classification (eligibility indicated by ‡)
Team classification	Denotes riders that represent the winner of the team classification
Super-combativity award	Denotes the winner of the super-combativity award
DNS	Denotes a rider who did not start a stage, followed by the stage before which he withdrew
DNF	Denotes a rider who did not finish a stage, followed by the stage in which he withdrew
DSQ	Denotes a rider who was disqualified from the race, followed by the stage in which this occurred
Age correct as of 4 July 2015, the date on which the Tour began

=== By starting number ===
No.	Name	Nationality	Team	Age	Pos.	Time	Ref
1	Vincenzo Nibali	Italy	Astana	30	4	+ 8' 36"	
2	Lars Boom	Netherlands	Astana	29	DNS-10	—	
3	Jakob Fuglsang	Denmark	Astana	30	23	+ 1h 25' 23"	
4	Andriy Hrivko	Ukraine	Astana	31	64	+ 2h 38' 06"	
5	Dmitriy Gruzdev	Kazakhstan	Astana	29	131	+ 4h 01' 12"	
6	Tanel Kangert	Estonia	Astana	28	22	+ 1h 24' 58"	
7	Michele Scarponi	Italy	Astana	35	41	+ 2h 05' 03"	
8	Rein Taaramäe	Estonia	Astana	28	DNF-11	—	
9	Lieuwe Westra	Netherlands	Astana	32	77	+ 3h 03' 09"	
11	Jean-Christophe Péraud	France	AG2R La Mondiale	38	61	+ 2h 35' 10"	
12	Romain Bardet ‡	France	AG2R La Mondiale	24	9	+ 16' 00"	
13	Jan Bakelants	Belgium	AG2R La Mondiale	29	20	+ 1h 16' 36"	
14	Mikaël Cherel	France	AG2R La Mondiale	29	18	+ 1h 05' 00"	
15	Ben Gastauer	Luxembourg	AG2R La Mondiale	27	DNF-11	—	
16	Damien Gaudin	France	AG2R La Mondiale	28	146	+ 4h 16' 13"	
17	Christophe Riblon	France	AG2R La Mondiale	34	68	+ 2h 48' 19"	
18	Johan Vansummeren	Belgium	AG2R La Mondiale	34	DNF-11	—	
19	Alexis Vuillermoz	France	AG2R La Mondiale	27	26	+ 1h 28' 29"	
21	Thibaut Pinot ‡	France	FDJ	25	16	+ 38' 52"	
22	William Bonnet	France	FDJ	33	DNF-3	—	
23	Sébastien Chavanel	France	FDJ	34	160	+ 4h 56' 59"	
24	Arnaud Démare ‡	France	FDJ	23	138	+ 4h 05' 28"	
25	Alexandre Geniez	France	FDJ	27	112	+ 3h 42' 57"	
26	Mathieu Ladagnous	France	FDJ	30	71	+ 2h 53' 22"	
27	Steve Morabito	Switzerland	FDJ	32	DNF-14	—	
28	Jérémy Roy	France	FDJ	32	105	+ 3h 32' 12"	
29	Benoît Vaugrenard	France	FDJ	33	113	+ 3h 43' 08"	
31	Chris Froome	Great Britain	Team Sky	30	1	84h 46' 14"	
32	Peter Kennaugh	Great Britain	Team Sky	26	DNF-16	—	
33	Leopold König	Czech Republic	Team Sky	27	70	+ 2h 53' 09"	
34	Wout Poels	Netherlands	Team Sky	27	44	+ 2h 12' 44"	
35	Richie Porte	Australia	Team Sky	30	48	+ 2h 16' 05"	
36	Nicolas Roche	Ireland	Team Sky	31	35	+ 1h 54' 08"	
37	Luke Rowe ‡	Great Britain	Team Sky	25	136	+ 4h 04' 45"	
38	Ian Stannard	Great Britain	Team Sky	28	128	+ 3h 59' 37"	
39	Geraint Thomas	Great Britain	Team Sky	29	15	+ 31' 39"	
41	Alberto Contador	Spain	Tinkoff–Saxo	32	5	+ 9' 48"	
42	Ivan Basso	Italy	Tinkoff–Saxo	37	DNS-10	—	
43	Daniele Bennati	Italy	Tinkoff–Saxo	34	DNF-11	—	
44	Roman Kreuziger	Czech Republic	Tinkoff–Saxo	29	17	+ 1h 02' 51"	
45	Rafał Majka	Poland	Tinkoff–Saxo	25	28	+ 1h 35' 06"	
46	Michael Rogers	Australia	Tinkoff–Saxo	35	36	+ 1h 56' 13"	
47	Peter Sagan ‡	Slovakia	Tinkoff–Saxo	25	46	+ 2h 14' 55"	
48	Matteo Tosatto	Italy	Tinkoff–Saxo	41	132	+ 4h 01' 15"	
49	Michael Valgren ‡	Denmark	Tinkoff–Saxo	23	DNF-19	—	
51	Nairo Quintana ‡	Colombia	Movistar Team	25	2	+ 1' 12"	
52	Winner Anacona	Colombia	Movistar Team	26	57	+ 2h 31' 14"	
53	Jonathan Castroviejo	Spain	Movistar Team	28	24	+ 1h 26' 05"	
54	Alex Dowsett	Great Britain	Movistar Team	26	DNF-12	—	
55	Imanol Erviti	Spain	Movistar Team	31	115	+ 3h 47' 14"	
56	José Herrada	Spain	Movistar Team	29	65	+ 2h 40' 06"	
57	Gorka Izagirre	Spain	Movistar Team	27	32	+ 1h 41' 34"	
58	Adriano Malori	Italy	Movistar Team	27	107	+ 3h 37' 28"	
59	Alejandro Valverde	Spain	Movistar Team	35	3	+ 5' 25"	
61	Tejay van Garderen	United States	BMC Racing Team	26	DNF-17	—	
62	Damiano Caruso	Italy	BMC Racing Team	27	53	+ 2h 26' 32"	
63	Rohan Dennis ‡	Australia	BMC Racing Team	25	101	+ 3h 27' 34"	
64	Daniel Oss	Italy	BMC Racing Team	28	97	+ 3h 22' 14"	
65	Manuel Quinziato	Italy	BMC Racing Team	35	120	+ 3h 53' 21"	
66	Samuel Sánchez	Spain	BMC Racing Team	37	12	+ 22' 50"	
67	Michael Schär	Switzerland	BMC Racing Team	28	56	+ 2h 31' 13"	
68	Greg Van Avermaet	Belgium	BMC Racing Team	30	DNS-16	—	
69	Danilo Wyss	Switzerland	BMC Racing Team	29	63	+ 2h 37' 17"	
71	Tony Gallopin	France	Lotto–Soudal	27	31	+ 1h 40' 44"	
72	Lars Bak	Denmark	Lotto–Soudal	35	37	+ 1h 56' 57"	
73	Thomas De Gendt	Belgium	Lotto–Soudal	28	67	+ 2h 48' 02"	
74	Jens Debusschere	Belgium	Lotto–Soudal	25	145	+ 4h 16' 06"	
75	André Greipel	Germany	Lotto–Soudal	32	134	+ 4h 03' 28"	
76	Adam Hansen	Australia	Lotto–Soudal	34	114	+ 3h 45' 18"	
77	Greg Henderson	New Zealand	Lotto–Soudal	38	DNS-7	—	
78	Marcel Sieberg	Germany	Lotto–Soudal	33	150	+ 4h 24' 52"	
79	Tim Wellens ‡	Belgium	Lotto–Soudal	24	129	+ 3h 59' 39"	
81	John Degenkolb	Germany	Team Giant–Alpecin	26	109	+ 3h 39' 43"	
82	Warren Barguil ‡	France	Team Giant–Alpecin	23	14	+ 31' 15"	
83	Roy Curvers	Netherlands	Team Giant–Alpecin	35	106	+ 3h 35' 40"	
84	Koen de Kort	Netherlands	Team Giant–Alpecin	32	73	+ 2h 57' 05"	
85	Tom Dumoulin ‡	Netherlands	Team Giant–Alpecin	24	DNF-3	—	
86	Simon Geschke	Germany	Team Giant–Alpecin	29	38	+ 1h 58' 14"	
87	Georg Preidler ‡	Austria	Team Giant–Alpecin	25	87	+ 3h 14' 14"	
88	Ramon Sinkeldam	Netherlands	Team Giant–Alpecin	26	DNF-14	—	
89	Albert Timmer	Netherlands	Team Giant–Alpecin	30	139	+ 4h 05' 30"	
91	Joaquim Rodríguez	Spain	Team Katusha	36	29	+ 1h 36' 07"	
92	Giampaolo Caruso	Italy	Team Katusha	34	90	+ 3h 17' 03"	
93	Jacopo Guarnieri	Italy	Team Katusha	27	149	+ 4h 22' 20"	
94	Marco Haller ‡	Austria	Team Katusha	24	126	+ 3h 59' 04"	
95	Dmitry Kozonchuk	Russia	Team Katusha	31	DNF-3	—	
96	Alexander Kristoff	Norway	Team Katusha	27	130	+ 4h 01' 06"	
97	Alberto Losada	Spain	Team Katusha	33	58	+ 2h 32' 30"	
98	Tiago Machado	Portugal	Team Katusha	29	72	+ 2h 54' 31"	
99	Luca Paolini	Italy	Team Katusha	38	DNS-8	—	
101	Simon Gerrans	Australia	Orica–GreenEDGE	35	DNF-3	—	
102	Michael Albasini	Switzerland	Orica–GreenEDGE	34	DNS-6	—	
103	Luke Durbridge ‡	Australia	Orica–GreenEDGE	24	151	+ 4h 24' 03"	
104	Daryl Impey	South Africa	Orica–GreenEDGE	30	DNS-4	—	
105	Michael Matthews ‡	Australia	Orica–GreenEDGE	24	152	+ 4h 26' 33"	
106	Svein Tuft	Canada	Orica–GreenEDGE	38	159	+ 4h 48' 08"	
107	Pieter Weening	Netherlands	Orica–GreenEDGE	34	144	+ 4h 15' 20"	
108	Adam Yates ‡	Great Britain	Orica–GreenEDGE	22	50	+ 2h 16' 36"	
109	Simon Yates ‡	Great Britain	Orica–GreenEDGE	22	89	+ 3h 16' 04"	
111	Michał Kwiatkowski ‡	Poland	Etixx–Quick-Step	25	DNF-17	—	
112	Mark Cavendish	Great Britain	Etixx–Quick-Step	30	142	+ 4h 12' 05"	
113	Michał Gołaś	Poland	Etixx–Quick-Step	31	95	+ 3h 21' 17"	
114	Tony Martin	Germany	Etixx–Quick-Step	30	DNS-7	—	
115	Mark Renshaw	Australia	Etixx–Quick-Step	32	DNF-18	—	
116	Zdeněk Štybar	Czech Republic	Etixx–Quick-Step	29	103	+ 3h 30' 13"	
117	Matteo Trentin	Italy	Etixx–Quick-Step	25	117	+ 3h 50' 59"	
118	Rigoberto Urán	Colombia	Etixx–Quick-Step	28	42	+ 2h 08' 20"	
119	Julien Vermote	Belgium	Etixx–Quick-Step	25	116	+ 3h 50' 32"	
121	Pierre Rolland	France	Team Europcar	28	10	+ 17' 30"	
122	Bryan Coquard ‡	France	Team Europcar	23	110	+ 3h 42' 36"	
123	Cyril Gautier	France	Team Europcar	27	34	+ 1h 51' 51"	
124	Yohann Gène	France	Team Europcar	34	137	+ 4h 04' 56"	
125	Bryan Nauleau	France	Team Europcar	27	157	+ 4h 40' 12"	
126	Perrig Quéméneur	France	Team Europcar	31	74	+ 2h 57' 19"	
127	Romain Sicard	France	Team Europcar	27	33	+ 1h 51' 32"	
128	Angelo Tulik ‡	France	Team Europcar	24	91	+ 3h 19' 44"	
129	Thomas Voeckler	France	Team Europcar	36	45	+ 2h 14' 08"	
131	Robert Gesink	Netherlands	LottoNL–Jumbo	29	6	+ 10' 47"	
132	Wilco Kelderman ‡	Netherlands	LottoNL–Jumbo	24	79	+ 3h 04' 07"	
133	Steven Kruijswijk	Netherlands	LottoNL–Jumbo	28	21	+ 1h 21' 27"	
134	Tom Leezer	Netherlands	LottoNL–Jumbo	29	153	+ 4h 26' 47"	
135	Paul Martens	Germany	LottoNL–Jumbo	31	80	+ 3h 04' 52"	
136	Bram Tankink	Netherlands	LottoNL–Jumbo	36	55	+ 2h 30' 12"	
137	Laurens ten Dam	Netherlands	LottoNL–Jumbo	34	92	+ 3h 17' 43"	
138	Jos van Emden	Netherlands	LottoNL–Jumbo	30	121	+ 3h 54' 19"	
139	Sep Vanmarcke	Belgium	LottoNL–Jumbo	26	104	+ 3h 31' 15"	
141	Bauke Mollema	Netherlands	Trek Factory Racing	28	7	+ 15' 14"	
142	Julián Arredondo	Colombia	Trek Factory Racing	26	124	+ 3h 56' 49"	
143	Fabian Cancellara	Switzerland	Trek Factory Racing	34	DNS-4	—	
144	Stijn Devolder	Belgium	Trek Factory Racing	35	148	+ 4h 21' 31"	
145	Laurent Didier	Luxembourg	Trek Factory Racing	30	DNS-17	—	
146	Markel Irizar	Spain	Trek Factory Racing	35	93	+ 3h 19' 44"	
147	Bob Jungels ‡	Luxembourg	Trek Factory Racing	22	27	+ 1h 33' 21"	
148	Grégory Rast	Switzerland	Trek Factory Racing	35	102	+ 3h 29' 00"	
149	Haimar Zubeldia	Spain	Trek Factory Racing	38	62	+ 2h 36' 50"	
151	Rui Costa	Portugal	Lampre–Merida	28	DNF-11	—	
152	Matteo Bono	Italy	Lampre–Merida	31	118	+ 3h 52' 17"	
153	Davide Cimolai	Italy	Lampre–Merida	25	155	+ 4h 33' 21"	
154	Kristijan Đurasek	Croatia	Lampre–Merida	27	76	+ 3h 02' 14"	
155	Nelson Oliveira	Portugal	Lampre–Merida	26	47	+ 2h 15' 32"	
156	Rubén Plaza	Spain	Lampre–Merida	35	30	+ 1h 38' 22"	
157	Filippo Pozzato	Italy	Lampre–Merida	33	125	+ 3h 58' 20"	
158	José Serpa	Colombia	Lampre–Merida	36	122	+ 3h 54' 25"	
159	Rafael Valls	Spain	Lampre–Merida	28	78	+ 3h 03' 11"	
161	Andrew Talansky	United States	Cannondale–Garmin	26	11	+ 22' 06"	
162	Jack Bauer	New Zealand	Cannondale–Garmin	30	DNF-5	—	
163	Nathan Haas	Australia	Cannondale–Garmin	26	DNF-17	—	
164	Ryder Hesjedal	Canada	Cannondale–Garmin	34	40	+ 2h 04' 37"	
165	Kristijan Koren	Slovenia	Cannondale–Garmin	28	69	+ 2h 51' 44"	
166	Sebastian Langeveld	Netherlands	Cannondale–Garmin	30	DNF-15	—	
167	Dan Martin	Ireland	Cannondale–Garmin	28	39	+ 2h 03' 37"	
168	Ramūnas Navardauskas	Lithuania	Cannondale–Garmin	27	143	+ 4h 14' 40"	
169	Dylan van Baarle ‡	Netherlands	Cannondale–Garmin	23	147	+ 4h 18' 40"	
171	Nacer Bouhanni ‡	France	Cofidis	24	DNF-5	—	
172	Nicolas Edet	France	Cofidis	27	111	+ 3h 42' 42"	
173	Christophe Laporte ‡	France	Cofidis	22	127	+ 3h 59' 10"	
174	Luis Ángel Maté	Spain	Cofidis	31	43	+ 2h 10' 12"	
175	Daniel Navarro	Spain	Cofidis	31	66	+ 2h 43' 34"	
176	Florian Sénéchal ‡	France	Cofidis	21	135	+ 4h 04' 06"	
177	Julien Simon	France	Cofidis	29	94	+ 3h 19' 53"	
178	Geoffrey Soupe	France	Cofidis	27	123	+ 3h 55' 35"	
179	Kenneth Vanbilsen ‡	Belgium	Cofidis	25	158	+ 4h 41' 27"	
181	Mathias Frank	Switzerland	IAM Cycling	28	8	+ 15' 39"	
182	Matthias Brändle	Austria	IAM Cycling	25	156	+ 4h 37' 36"	
183	Sylvain Chavanel	France	IAM Cycling	36	54	+ 2h 29' 28"	
184	Stef Clement	Netherlands	IAM Cycling	32	59	+ 2h 33' 42"	
185	Jérôme Coppel	France	IAM Cycling	28	DNF-17	—	
186	Martin Elmiger	Switzerland	IAM Cycling	36	100	+ 3h 26' 47"	
187	Reto Hollenstein	Switzerland	IAM Cycling	29	75	+ 2h 58' 30"	
188	Jarlinson Pantano	Colombia	IAM Cycling	26	19	+ 1h 09' 08"	
189	Marcel Wyss	Switzerland	IAM Cycling	29	60	+ 2h 34' 38"	
191	Dominik Nerz	Germany	Bora–Argon 18	25	DNF-11	—	
192	Jan Bárta	Czech Republic	Bora–Argon 18	30	25	+ 1h 26' 36"	
193	Sam Bennett ‡	Ireland	Bora–Argon 18	24	DNF-17	—	
194	Emanuel Buchmann ‡	Germany	Bora–Argon 18	22	83	+ 3h 08' 47"	
195	Zak Dempster	Australia	Bora–Argon 18	27	DNF-12	—	
196	Bartosz Huzarski	Poland	Bora–Argon 18	34	108	+ 3h 38' 06"	
197	José Mendes	Portugal	Bora–Argon 18	30	140	+ 4h 07' 47"	
198	Andreas Schillinger	Germany	Bora–Argon 18	31	DNS-4	—	
199	Paul Voss	Germany	Bora–Argon 18	29	99	+ 3h 24' 53"	
201	Eduardo Sepúlveda ‡	Argentina	Bretagne–Séché Environnement	24	DSQ-14	—	
202	Frédéric Brun	France	Bretagne–Séché Environnement	26	141	+ 4h 10' 32"	
203	Anthony Delaplace	France	Bretagne–Séché Environnement	25	85	+ 3h 11' 28"	
204	Pierrick Fédrigo	France	Bretagne–Séché Environnement	36	52	+ 2h 22' 54"	
205	Brice Feillu	France	Bretagne–Séché Environnement	29	98	+ 3h 23' 11"	
206	Armindo Fonseca	France	Bretagne–Séché Environnement	26	119	+ 3h 53' 13"	
207	Arnaud Gérard	France	Bretagne–Séché Environnement	30	133	+ 4h 02' 06"	
208	Pierre-Luc Périchon	France	Bretagne–Séché Environnement	28	81	+ 3h 05' 48"	
209	Florian Vachon	France	Bretagne–Séché Environnement	30	88	+ 3h 15' 01"	
211	Edvald Boasson Hagen	Norway	MTN–Qhubeka	28	82	+ 3h 08' 02"	
212	Steve Cummings	Great Britain	MTN–Qhubeka	34	86	+ 3h 12' 23"	
213	Tyler Farrar	United States	MTN–Qhubeka	31	154	+ 4h 32' 32"	
214	Jacques Janse van Rensburg	South Africa	MTN–Qhubeka	27	51	+ 2h 18' 16"	
215	Reinardt Janse van Rensburg	South Africa	MTN–Qhubeka	26	96	+ 3h 21' 30"	
216	Merhawi Kudus ‡	Eritrea	MTN–Qhubeka	21	84	+ 3h 10' 36"	
217	Louis Meintjes ‡	South Africa	MTN–Qhubeka	23	DNS-18	—	
218	Serge Pauwels	Belgium	MTN–Qhubeka	31	13	+ 31' 03"	
219	Daniel Teklehaimanot	Eritrea	MTN–Qhubeka	26	49	+ 2h 16' 15"	

=== By team ===
Astana (AST)
No.	Rider	Pos.
1	Vincenzo Nibali (ITA)	4
2	Lars Boom (NED)	DNS-10
3	Jakob Fuglsang (DEN)	23
4	Andriy Hrivko (UKR)	64
5	Dmitriy Gruzdev (KAZ)	131
6	Tanel Kangert (EST)	22
7	Michele Scarponi (ITA)	41
8	Rein Taaramäe (EST)	DNF-11
9	Lieuwe Westra (NED)	77
Directeur sportif: Alexandr Shefer

AG2R La Mondiale (ALM)
No.	Rider	Pos.
11	Jean-Christophe Péraud (FRA)	61
12	Romain Bardet (FRA) ‡	9
13	Jan Bakelants (BEL)	20
14	Mikaël Cherel (FRA)	18
15	Ben Gastauer (LUX)	DNF-11
16	Damien Gaudin (FRA)	146
17	Christophe Riblon (FRA)	68
18	Johan Vansummeren (BEL)	DNF-11
19	Alexis Vuillermoz (FRA)	26
Directeur sportif: Vincent Lavenu

FDJ (FDJ)
No.	Rider	Pos.
21	Thibaut Pinot (FRA) ‡	16
22	William Bonnet (FRA)	DNF-3
23	Sébastien Chavanel (FRA)	160
24	Arnaud Démare (FRA) ‡	138
25	Alexandre Geniez (FRA)	112
26	Mathieu Ladagnous (FRA)	71
27	Steve Morabito (SUI)	DNF-14
28	Jérémy Roy (FRA)	105
29	Benoît Vaugrenard (FRA)	113
Directeur sportif: Thierry Bricaud

Team Sky (SKY)
No.	Rider	Pos.
31	Chris Froome (GBR)	1
32	Peter Kennaugh (GBR)	DNF-16
33	Leopold König (CZE)	70
34	Wout Poels (NED)	44
35	Richie Porte (AUS)	48
36	Nicolas Roche (IRL)	35
37	Luke Rowe (GBR) ‡	136
38	Ian Stannard (GBR)	128
39	Geraint Thomas (GBR)	15
Directeur sportif: Nicolas Portal

Tinkoff–Saxo (SAX)
No.	Rider	Pos.
41	Alberto Contador (ESP)	5
42	Ivan Basso (ITA)	DNS-10
43	Daniele Bennati (ITA)	DNF-11
44	Roman Kreuziger (CZE)	17
45	Rafał Majka (POL)	28
46	Michael Rogers (AUS)	36
47	Peter Sagan (SVK) ‡	46
48	Matteo Tosatto (ITA)	132
49	Michael Valgren (DEN)	DNF-19
Directeur sportif: Steven de Jongh

Movistar Team (MOV)
No.	Rider	Pos.
51	Nairo Quintana (COL) ‡	2
52	Winner Anacona (COL)	57
53	Jonathan Castroviejo (ESP)	24
54	Alex Dowsett (GBR)	DNF-12
55	Imanol Erviti (ESP)	115
56	José Herrada (ESP)	65
57	Gorka Izagirre (ESP)	32
58	Adriano Malori (ITA)	107
59	Alejandro Valverde (ESP)	3
Directeur sportif: José Luis Arrieta

BMC Racing Team (BMC)
No.	Rider	Pos.
61	Tejay van Garderen (USA)	DNF-17
62	Damiano Caruso (ITA)	53
63	Rohan Dennis (AUS) ‡	101
64	Daniel Oss (ITA)	97
65	Manuel Quinziato (ITA)	120
66	Samuel Sánchez (SPA)	12
67	Michael Schär (SUI)	56
68	Greg Van Avermaet (BEL)	DNS-16
69	Danilo Wyss (SUI)	63
Directeur sportif: Yvon Ledanois

Lotto–Soudal (LTS)
No.	Rider	Pos.
71	Tony Gallopin (FRA)	31
72	Lars Bak (DEN)	37
73	Thomas De Gendt (BEL)	67
74	Jens Debusschere (BEL)	145
75	André Greipel (GER)	134
76	Adam Hansen (AUS)	114
77	Greg Henderson (NZL)	DNS-7
78	Marcel Sieberg (GER)	150
79	Tim Wellens (BEL) ‡	129
Directeur sportif: Herman Frison

Team Giant–Alpecin (GIA)
No.	Rider	Pos.
81	John Degenkolb (GER)	109
82	Warren Barguil (FRA) ‡	14
83	Roy Curvers (NED)	106
84	Koen de Kort (NED)	73
85	Tom Dumoulin (NED) ‡	DNF-3
86	Simon Geschke (GER)	38
87	Georg Preidler (AUT) ‡	87
88	Ramon Sinkeldam (NED)	DNS-14
89	Albert Timmer (NED)	139
Directeur sportif: Marc Reef

Team Katusha (KAT)
No.	Rider	Pos.
91	Joaquim Rodríguez (ESP)	29
92	Giampaolo Caruso (ITA)	90
93	Jacopo Guarnieri (ITA)	149
94	Marco Haller (AUT) ‡	126
95	Dmitry Kozonchuk (RUS)	DNF-3
96	Alexander Kristoff (NOR)	130
97	Alberto Losada (ESP)	58
98	Tiago Machado (POR)	72
99	Luca Paolini (ITA)	DNS-8
Directeur sportif: José Azevedo

Orica–GreenEDGE (OGE)
No.	Rider	Pos.
101	Simon Gerrans (AUS)	DNF-3
102	Michael Albasini (SUI)	DNS-6
103	Luke Durbridge (AUS) ‡	151
104	Daryl Impey (RSA)	DNS-4
105	Michael Matthews (AUS) ‡	152
106	Svein Tuft (CAN)	159
107	Pieter Weening (NED)	144
108	Adam Yates (GBR) ‡	50
109	Simon Yates (GBR) ‡	89
Directeur sportif: Matthew White

Etixx–Quick-Step (EQS)
No.	Rider	Pos.
111	Michał Kwiatkowski (POL) ‡	DNF-17
112	Mark Cavendish (GBR)	142
113	Michał Gołaś (POL)	95
114	Tony Martin (GER)	DNS-7
115	Mark Renshaw (AUS)	DNF-18
116	Zdeněk Štybar (CZE)	103
117	Matteo Trentin (ITA)	117
118	Rigoberto Urán (COL)	42
119	Julien Vermote (BEL)	116
Directeur sportif: Wilfried Peeters

Team Europcar (EUC)
No.	Rider	Pos.
121	Pierre Rolland (FRA)	10
122	Bryan Coquard (FRA) ‡	110
123	Cyril Gautier (FRA)	34
124	Yohann Gène (FRA)	137
125	Bryan Nauleau (FRA)	157
126	Perrig Quéméneur (FRA)	74
127	Romain Sicard (FRA)	33
128	Angelo Tulik (FRA) ‡	91
129	Thomas Voeckler (FRA)	45
Directeur sportif: Andy Flickinger

LottoNL–Jumbo (TLJ)
No.	Rider	Pos.
131	Robert Gesink (NED)	6
132	Wilco Kelderman (NED) ‡	79
133	Steven Kruijswijk (NED)	21
134	Tom Leezer (NED)	153
135	Paul Martens (GER)	80
136	Bram Tankink (NED)	55
137	Laurens ten Dam (NED)	92
138	Jos van Emden (NED)	121
139	Sep Vanmarcke (BEL)	104
Directeur sportif: Nico Verhoeven

Trek Factory Racing (TFR)
No.	Rider	Pos.
141	Bauke Mollema (NED)	7
142	Julián Arredondo (COL)	124
143	Fabian Cancellara (SUI)	DNS-4
144	Stijn Devolder (BEL)	148
145	Laurent Didier (LUX)	DNS-17
146	Markel Irizar (ESP)	93
147	Bob Jungels (LUX) ‡	27
148	Grégory Rast (SUI)	102
149	Haimar Zubeldia (ESP)	62
Directeur sportif: Kim Andersen

Lampre–Merida (LAM)
No.	Rider	Pos.
151	Rui Costa (POR)	DNF-11
152	Matteo Bono (ITA)	118
153	Davide Cimolai (ITA)	155
154	Kristijan Đurasek (CRO)	76
155	Nelson Oliveira (POR)	47
156	Rubén Plaza (ESP)	30
157	Filippo Pozzato (ITA)	125
158	José Serpa (COL)	122
159	Rafael Valls (ESP)	78
Directeur sportif: Philippe Mauduit

Cannondale–Garmin (TCG)
No.	Rider	Pos.
161	Andrew Talansky (USA)	11
162	Jack Bauer (NZL)	DNF-5
163	Nathan Haas (AUS)	DNF-17
164	Ryder Hesjedal (CAN)	40
165	Kristijan Koren (SLO)	69
166	Sebastian Langeveld (NED)	DNF-15
167	Dan Martin (IRL)	39
168	Ramūnas Navardauskas (LTU)	143
169	Dylan van Baarle (NED) ‡	147
Directeur sportif: Charly Wegelius

Cofidis (COF)
No.	Rider	Pos.
171	Nacer Bouhanni (FRA) ‡	DNF-5
172	Nicolas Edet (FRA)	111
173	Christophe Laporte (FRA) ‡	127
174	Luis Ángel Maté (ESP)	43
175	Daniel Navarro (ESP)	66
176	Florian Sénéchal (FRA)	135
177	Julien Simon (FRA)	94
178	Geoffrey Soupe (FRA)	123
179	Kenneth Vanbilsen (BEL)	158
Directeur sportif: Didier Rous

IAM Cycling (IAM)
No.	Rider	Pos.
181	Mathias Frank (SUI)	8
182	Matthias Brändle (AUT)	156
183	Sylvain Chavanel (FRA)	54
184	Stef Clement (NED)	59
185	Jérôme Coppel (FRA)	DNF-17
186	Martin Elmiger (SUI)	100
187	Reto Hollenstein (SUI)	75
188	Jarlinson Pantano (COL)	19
189	Marcel Wyss (SUI)	60
Directeur sportif: Eddy Seigneur

Bora–Argon 18 (TNE)
No.	Rider	Pos.
191	Dominik Nerz (GER)	DNF-11
192	Jan Bárta (CZE)	25
193	Sam Bennett (IRL) ‡	DNF-17
194	Emanuel Buchmann (GER) ‡	83
195	Zak Dempster (AUS)	DNF-12
196	Bartosz Huzarski (POL)	108
197	José Mendes (POR)	140
198	Andreas Schillinger (GER)	DNS-4
199	Paul Voss (GER)	99
Directeur sportif: Enrico Poitschke

Bretagne–Séché Environnement (BSE)
No.	Rider	Pos.
201	Eduardo Sepúlveda (ARG) ‡	DSQ-14
202	Frédéric Brun (FRA)	141
203	Anthony Delaplace (FRA)	85
204	Pierrick Fédrigo (FRA)	52
205	Brice Feillu (FRA)	98
206	Armindo Fonseca (FRA)	119
207	Arnaud Gérard (FRA)	133
208	Pierre-Luc Périchon (FRA)	81
209	Florian Vachon (FRA)	88
Directeur sportif: Emmanuel Hubert

MTN–Qhubeka (MTN)
No.	Rider	Pos.
211	Edvald Boasson Hagen (NOR)	82
212	Steve Cummings (GBR)	86
213	Tyler Farrar (USA)	154
214	Jacques Janse van Rensburg (RSA)	51
215	Reinardt Janse van Rensburg (RSA)	96
216	Merhawi Kudus (ERI) ‡	84
217	Louis Meintjes (RSA) ‡	DNS-18
218	Serge Pauwels (BEL)	13
219	Daniel Teklehaimanot (ERI)	49
Directeur sportif: Jens Zemke

=== By nationality ===
The 198 riders that competed in the 2015 Tour de France represented 32 different countries. Riders from nine countries won stages during the race; German riders won the largest number of stages.

Country	No. of riders	Finishers	Stage wins
Argentina	1	0	
Australia	10	6	1 (Rohan Dennis)
Austria	3	3	
Belgium	11	9	1 (Greg Van Avermaet)
Canada	2	2	
Colombia	6	6	
Croatia	1	1	
Czech Republic	4	4	1 (Zdeněk Štybar)
Denmark	3	2	
Eritrea	2	2	
Estonia	2	1	
France	41	38	3 (Romain Bardet, Thibaut Pinot, Alexis Vuillermoz)
Germany	10	7	6 (André Greipel ×4, Simon Geschke, Tony Martin)
Great Britain	10	8	3 (Mark Cavendish, Steve Cummings, Chris Froome)
Ireland	3	2	
Italy	16	13	1 (Vincenzo Nibali)
Kazakhstan	1	1	
Lithuania	1	1	
Luxembourg	3	1	
Netherlands	20	16	
New Zealand	2	0	
Norway	2	2	
Poland	4	3	1 (Rafał Majka)
Portugal	4	3	
Russia	1	0	
Slovakia	1	1	
Slovenia	1	1	
South Africa	4	2	
Spain	15	15	3 (Joaquim Rodríguez ×2, Rubén Plaza)
Switzerland	10	7	
Ukraine	1	1	
United States	3	2	
Total	198	160	20 (Note: The team time trial on stage 9, won by BMC Racing Team, is not counted in this total.)
