= 2015 Tour de France, Stage 1 to Stage 11 =

Stages of cycle race

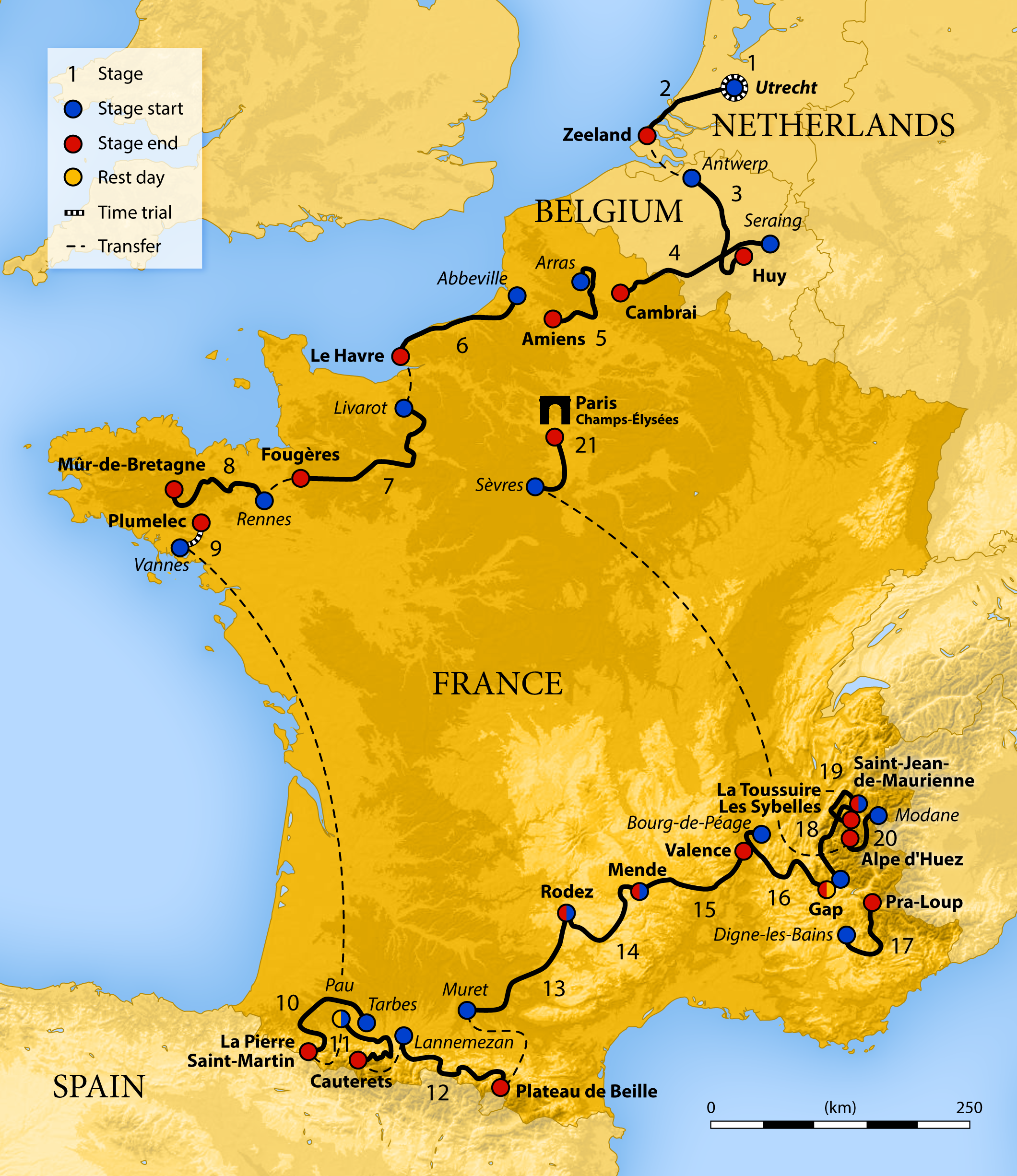
Route of the 2015 Tour de France

The 2015 Tour de France was the 102nd edition of the race, one of cycling's Grand Tours. The Tour started in Utrecht, Netherlands on 4 July and finished on the Champs-Élysées in Paris on 26 July. On 13 July, between stages nine and ten there was a rest day in Pau.

== Classification standings ==
Legend
Yellow jersey	Denotes the leader of the general classification	Green jersey	Denotes the leader of the points classification
Polka dot jersey	Denotes the leader of the mountains classification	White jersey	Denotes the leader of the young rider classification
Jersey with a yellow background on the number bib.	Denotes the leader of the team classification		

== Stage 1 ==
4 July 2015 — Utrecht, 13.8 km (9 mi) individual time trial (ITT)

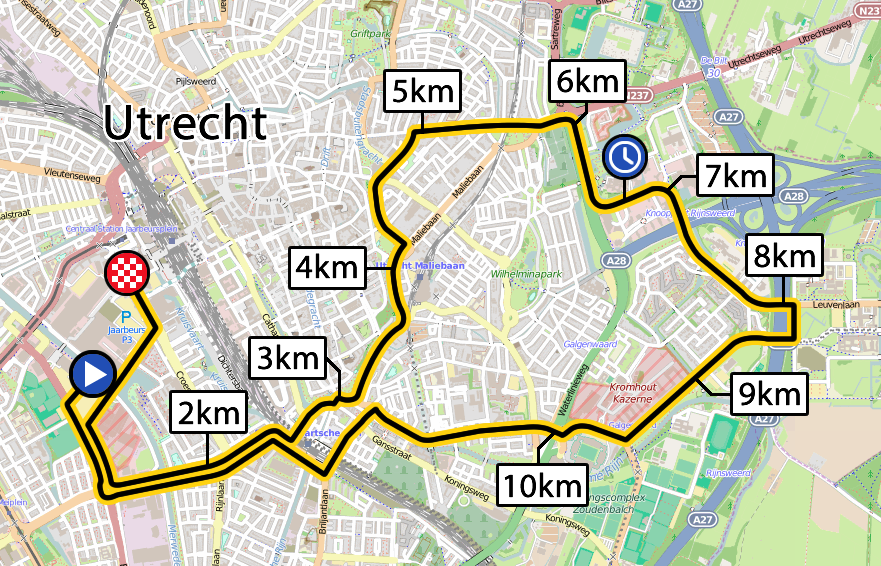
Stage one route map

The Tour began on 4 July in the Netherlands, with an individual time trial that started and finished at Jaarbeurs, Utrecht. Because of its length, it did not qualify as a prologue. The course, which featured 20 turns and two roundabouts (traffic circles), was flat and mildly technical.

The first rider off the start ramp was Daniel Teklehaimanot of MTN–Qhubeka, who became the first black African to compete in a Tour de France. Jos van Emden of LottoNL–Jumbo set the first good benchmark time, clocking in at 15' 11". He remained atop the leaderboard until Rohan Dennis of BMC Racing Team took over with a time of 14' 56". Dennis, who had clocked an average speed of 55.446 km/h (34.5 mph), held on to win the stage and became the first yellow jersey wearer of the race. With his performance, he established a new record for average speed in a Tour de France individual time trial. Tony Martin of Etixx–Quick-Step took second, finishing five seconds behind Dennis. Fabian Cancellara (Trek Factory Racing), who came into the event with five previous Tour de France opening time trial victories, finished six seconds off Dennis' time and took third.

In the battle for the general classification, Thibaut Pinot of FDJ had one of the best times among the favorites for overall classification, 41 seconds behind Dennis, despite not having a reputation as a good time trialist. Tejay van Garderen (BMC Racing Team) and Vincenzo Nibali (Astana) also set good times, finishing one and two seconds behind Pinot, respectively.

Stage 1 result and general classification

Rank	Rider	Team	Time
1	Rohan Dennis (AUS)	BMC Racing Team	14' 56"
2	Tony Martin (GER)	Etixx–Quick-Step	+ 5"
3	Fabian Cancellara (SUI)	Trek Factory Racing	+ 6"
4	Tom Dumoulin (NED)	Team Giant–Alpecin	+ 8"
5	Jos van Emden (NED)	LottoNL–Jumbo	+ 15"
6	Jonathan Castroviejo (ESP)	Movistar Team	+ 23"
7	Matthias Brändle (AUT)	IAM Cycling	+ 23"
8	Adriano Malori (ITA)	Movistar Team	+ 29"
9	Wilco Kelderman (NED)	LottoNL–Jumbo	+ 30"
10	Steve Cummings (GBR)	MTN–Qhubeka	+ 32"

== Stage 2 ==
5 July 2015 — Utrecht to Zeeland, 166 km (103 mi)

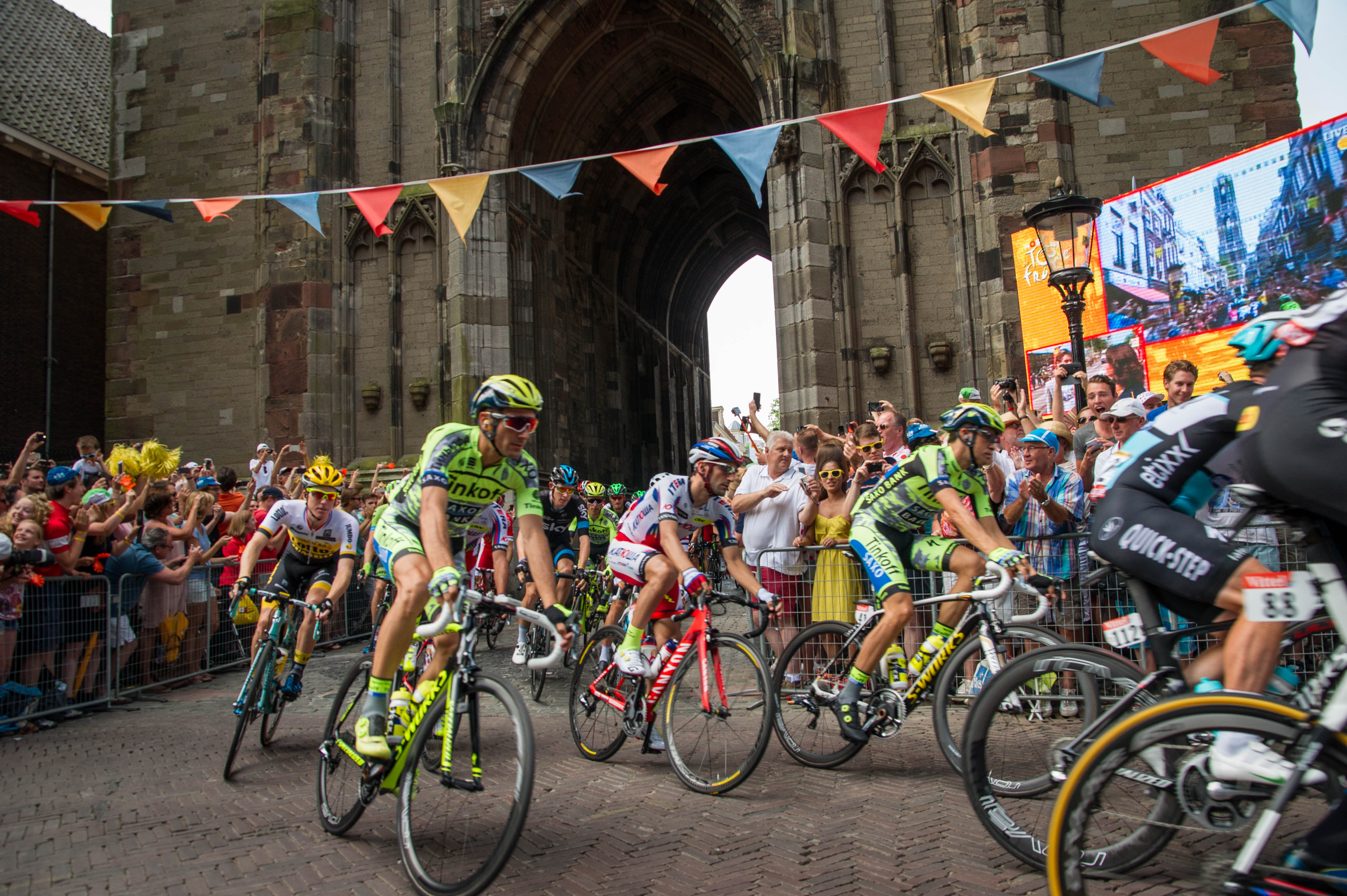
The cyclists pass under the Dom Tower in Utrecht.

This flat stage started in Utrecht. The riders rode underneath the Dom Tower and then went to De Meern. The race headed through Gouda before an intermediate sprint in Rotterdam. The peloton continued west through Spijkenisse and Hellevoetsluis, before crossing Haringvliet and Grevelingen. The finish was on Neeltje Jans, an artificial island at the entrance to the Scheldt estuary, in the province of Zeeland. Cycling commentators suggested before the race that strong winds off the sea could have a major impact, potentially splitting the peloton into echelons.

Before the start, at km 0, an honorary start in Utrecht, which involved the playing of the French and Dutch national anthems in the presence of Jan van Zanen, Mayor of Utrecht, Christian Prudhomme, the race director and cycling legends Bernard Hinault and Joop Zoetemelk.

After the ceremonies, the race begun, and a breakaway formed, which consisted of Team Europcar's Bryan Nauleau, Jan Bárta of Bora–Argon 18, Stef Clement representing IAM Cycling and Bretagne–Séché Environnement's Armindo Fonseca. The quartet weren't allowed a significant time gap, however, with their maximum lead over the peloton remaining below three minutes throughout the stage. At the intermediate sprint in Rotterdam, won by Barta, their lead was a mere 30". Whilst he, Clement and Fonesca desperately tried to continue riding before the yellow jersey group, they were caught with 62 km (39 mi) to go.

It was then that the race headed towards the open sea, and large echelons were formed. The riders were split into three groups, however the last two of those eventually merged. When the situation became clear, 2nd and 3rd placed Tony Martin and Fabian Cancellara, sprinters Mark Cavendish and André Greipel and GC favourites Alberto Contador, Chris Froome and Tejay van Garderen were all shown to be in the first group, whilst leader Rohan Dennis and other GC favourites Vincenzo Nibali, Nairo Quintana, Joaquim Rodríguez and Thibaut Pinot were all in the second group. Thanks to work from world champion Michał Kwiatkowski (who later received the combativity award for his work), Team Sky, Tinkoff–Saxo and BMC Racing Team, the gap continued to increase, eventually reaching over one minute. This was a clear blow to the chances of those caught in the second group.

During the sprint finish, Cavendish had his leadout man Mark Renshaw helping him. However, as Cavendish later said, Renshaw got out of the way too early making for a long sprint. This allowed Greipel, Sagan and Cancellara to catch up. Greipel later won a very close sprint finish, with Sagan second and Cancellara third. Cavendish gave up towards the end and came fourth. Had he continued, and come in third, his teammate Tony Martin would have taken the yellow jersey. Instead, the time bonus for his position was sufficient to grant the yellow jersey to Cancellara. Eventually, the second group arrived 1'28" behind the winners.

Stage 2 result

Rank	Rider	Team	Time
1	André Greipel (GER)	Lotto–Soudal	3h 29' 03"
2	Peter Sagan (SVK)	Tinkoff–Saxo	+ 0"
3	Fabian Cancellara (SUI)	Trek Factory Racing	+ 0"
4	Mark Cavendish (GBR)	Etixx–Quick-Step	+ 0"
5	Daniel Oss (ITA)	BMC Racing Team	+ 0"
6	Greg Van Avermaet (BEL)	BMC Racing Team	+ 0"
7	Chris Froome (GBR)	Team Sky	+ 0"
8	Tom Dumoulin (NED)	Team Giant–Alpecin	+ 0"
9	Tony Martin (GER)	Etixx–Quick-Step	+ 0"
10	Warren Barguil (FRA)	Team Giant–Alpecin	+ 0"

General classification after stage 2

Rank	Rider	Team	Time
1	Fabian Cancellara (SUI)	Trek Factory Racing	3h 44' 01"
2	Tony Martin (GER)	Etixx–Quick-Step	+ 3"
3	Tom Dumoulin (NED)	Team Giant–Alpecin	+ 6"
4	Peter Sagan (SVK)	Tinkoff–Saxo	+ 33"
5	Geraint Thomas (GBR)	Team Sky	+ 35"
6	Daniel Oss (ITA)	BMC Racing Team	+ 42"
7	Rigoberto Urán (COL)	Etixx–Quick-Step	+ 42"
8	Tejay van Garderen (USA)	BMC Racing Team	+ 44"
9	Greg Van Avermaet (BEL)	BMC Racing Team	+ 48"
10	Chris Froome (GBR)	Team Sky	+ 48"

== Stage 3 ==
6 July 2015 — Antwerp to Huy, 159.5 km (99 mi)

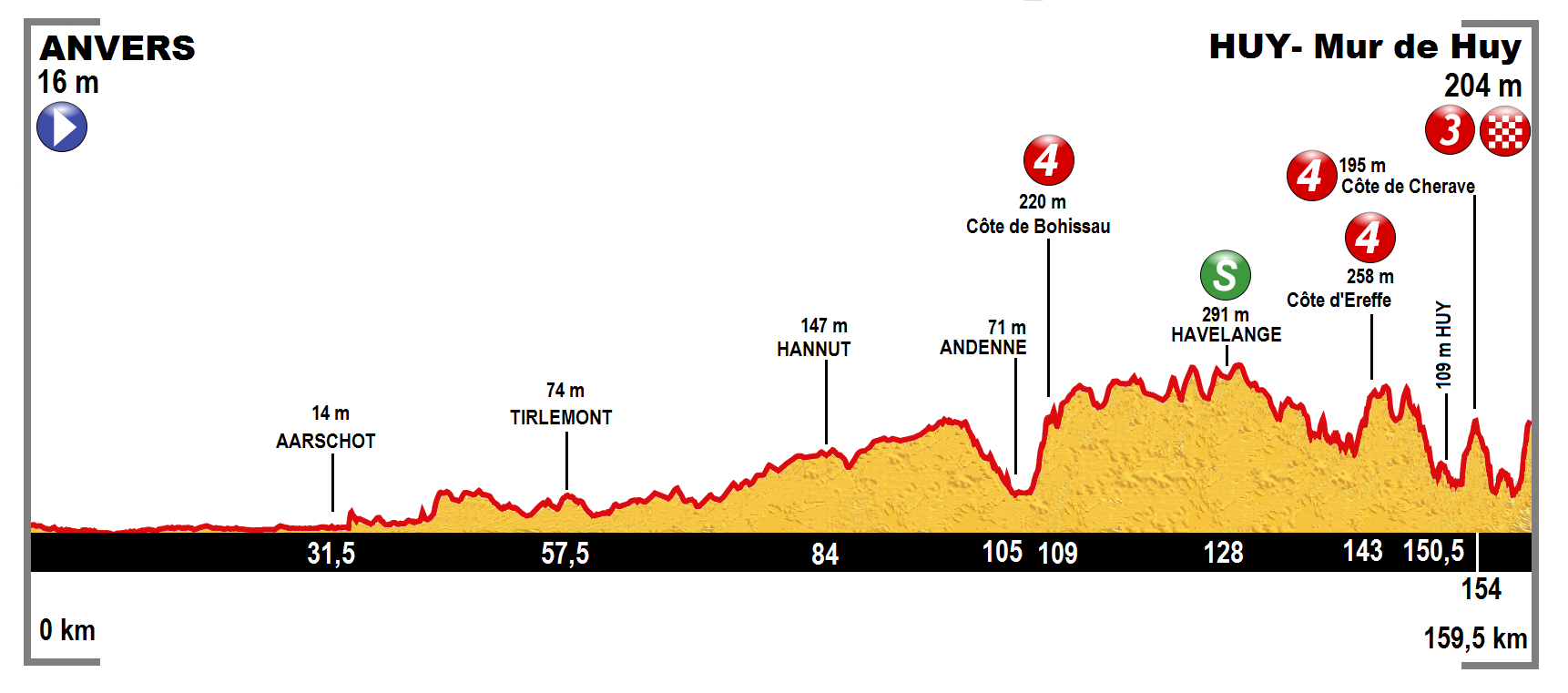
Stage 3 profile

The tour moved to Belgium for the third stage, starting in Antwerp and ending in Huy. The stage proper began at the end of the neutral zone in Boechout, south-west of Antwerp, and continued through Lierre, Aarschot, Tienen and Hannut. Andenne was followed quickly by the first climb of the tour, which was the category 4 Côte de Bohissau. Following a sprint at Havelange, the tour went over the category 4 Côte de Ereffe and the Côte de Cherave on the outskirts of Huy. The stage finished on the category 3 Mur de Huy, a 1.3 km (0.81 mi) climb with a maximum gradient of 19% in the final few hundred metres.

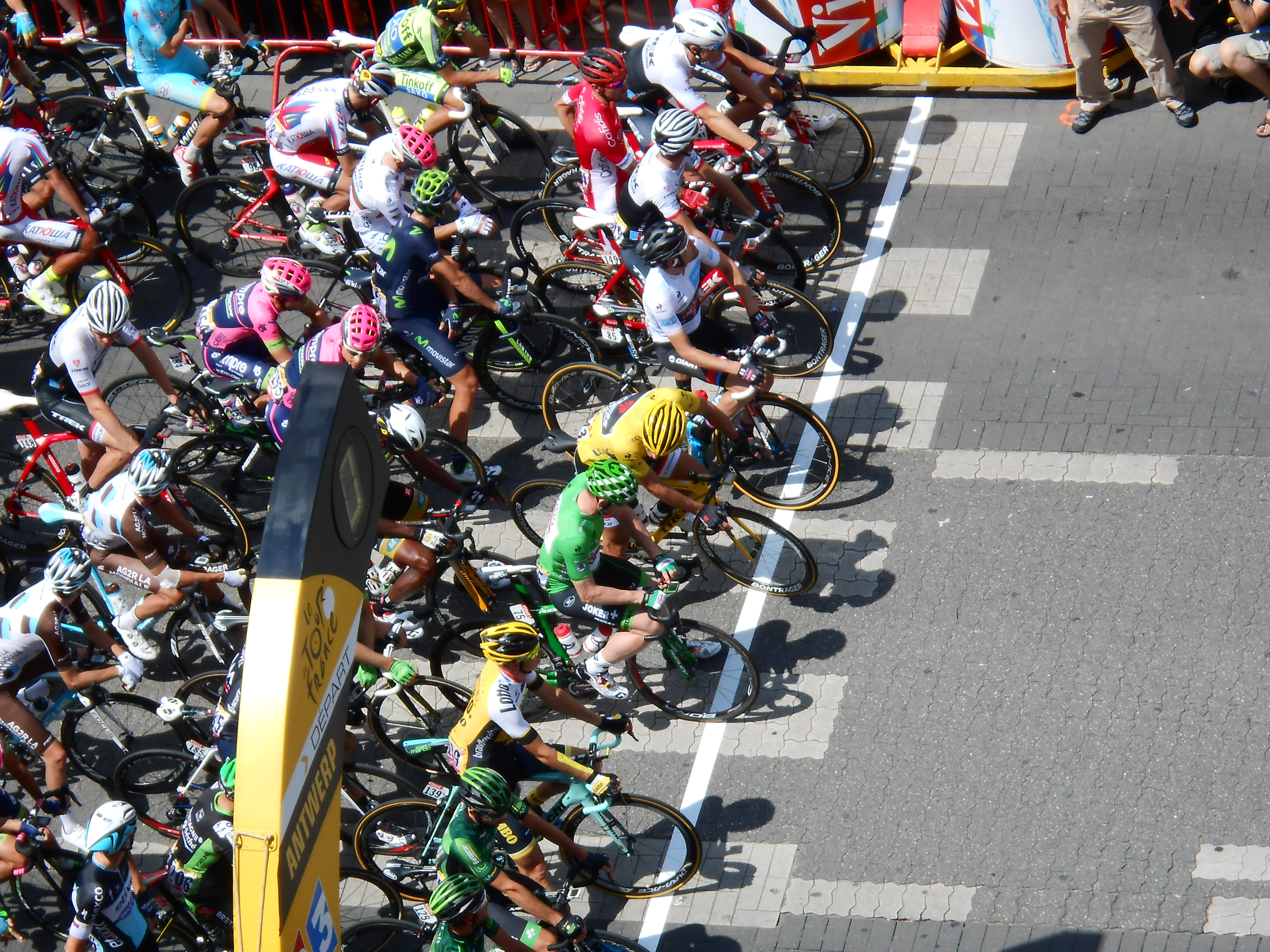
The riders at the start line in Antwerp, Belgium.

Like in the previous stage, the day's breakaway was formed immediately after the start. Bryan Nauleau and Jan Bárta were in it again, like the day before, joined by Martin Elmiger representing IAM Cycling and MTN–Qhubeka's Serge Pauwels, again making a quartet. This time, they were allowed a slightly bigger lead, as it reached four minutes before the peloton began the chase. Barta won the most combative rider of the day award.

As they were being caught, and when the peloton was getting ready to tackle the first climb of the Tour at full speed, (the Côte de Bohisseau) a huge crash occurred in the field. Among those who went down were leader Fabian Cancellara, third placed Tom Dumoulin who was also the leader of the young rider's classification, William Bonnet and Simon Gerrans. The peloton was initially neutralized to allow those riders to catch up so that the riders could come back to the peloton, before being completely stopped at the foot of the ascent. The cause for this was the lack of ambulances and the doctor, who were all busy treating the injured riders. Bonnet, Gerrans and Dumoulin abandoned, soon followed by Dmitry Kozontchuk. Once the race restarted, the Bohissau climb was neutralised.

Green jersey holder André Greipel took full points at the intermediate sprint in Havelange, before the climbs of the fourth category Côte d'Ereffe and Côte de Cherave. None of these caused major losses from the GC contenders, although the Cherave did slightly split the bunch. Cancellara was already far back, experiencing the effects from his crash, ensuring a loss of the yellow jersey. On the Mur de Huy, the favourites came to the fore, and it was Joaquim Rodríguez who attacked with 400 m (1,312 ft) to go, ensuring a stage victory for himself. Chris Froome came second, and later took the yellow jersey as Cancellara came in almost twelve minutes after the winner. He gained time over his GC rivals. Later, Froome said, "I didn’t wake up today thinking I was going to be in yellow", and, "That was a real surprise there."

Later in the evening, it was revealed that Cancellara had suffered two transverse process fractures in two vertebrae in his lower back. He abandoned the race.

Stage 3 result

Rank	Rider	Team	Time
1	Joaquim Rodríguez (ESP)	Team Katusha	3h 26' 54"
2	Chris Froome (GBR)	Team Sky	+ 0"
3	Alexis Vuillermoz (FRA)	AG2R La Mondiale	+ 4"
4	Dan Martin (IRL)	Cannondale–Garmin	+ 5"
5	Tony Gallopin (FRA)	Lotto–Soudal	+ 8"
6	Tejay van Garderen (USA)	BMC Racing Team	+ 11"
7	Vincenzo Nibali (ITA)	Astana	+ 11"
8	Simon Yates (GBR)	Orica–GreenEDGE	+ 11"
9	Nairo Quintana (COL)	Movistar Team	+ 11"
10	Bauke Mollema (NED)	Trek Factory Racing	+ 11"

General classification after stage 3

Rank	Rider	Team	Time
1	Chris Froome (GBR)	Team Sky	7h 11' 37"
2	Tony Martin (GER)	Etixx–Quick-Step	+ 1"
3	Tejay van Garderen (USA)	BMC Racing Team	+ 13"
4	Tony Gallopin (FRA)	Lotto–Soudal	+ 26"
5	Greg Van Avermaet (BEL)	BMC Racing Team	+ 28"
6	Peter Sagan (SVK)	Tinkoff–Saxo	+ 31"
7	Rigoberto Urán (COL)	Etixx–Quick-Step	+ 34"
8	Alberto Contador (ESP)	Tinkoff–Saxo	+ 36"
9	Geraint Thomas (GBR)	Team Sky	+ 1' 03"
10	Zdeněk Štybar (CZE)	Etixx–Quick-Step	+ 1' 04"

== Stage 4 ==
7 July 2015 — Seraing to Cambrai, 223.5 km (139 mi)

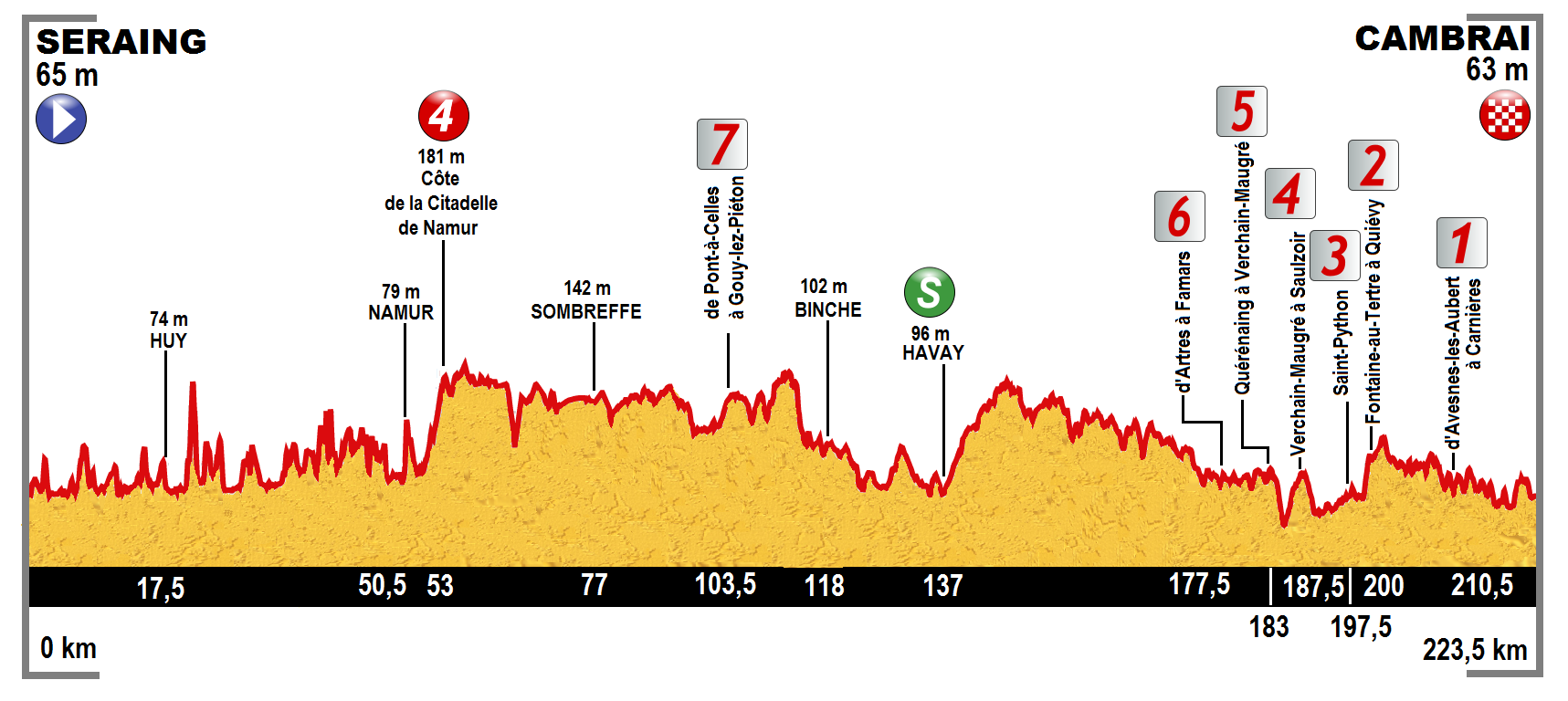
Stage 4 profile

The fourth stage was the Tour's first entry into France as the peloton covered seven sectors of pavé on the way to Cambrai.

This flat stage departed from Seraing heading west through Huy, to Namur, where the riders faced the category 4 Côte de la Citadelle de Namur. The riders passed around the northern outskirts of Charleroi, through Sombreffe and over the first section of cobbles between Pont-à-Celles and Gouy-lez-Piéton. The race then continued towards the south-east to Binche, before an intermediate sprint at Havay. Three-quarters of the way through the stage, after passing through Le Quesnoy, where the race turned north-west, the six remaining sections of pavé followed. Sector 6 arrived before reaching Famars, where the riders turned south-west. Sectors 5 and 4 followed before the turn south-east at Saulzoir. The riders then did have a tarmac surface to Saint-Python. Sectors 3, 2 and 1 then all occurred on the way west to Carnières. The riders then returned to the tarmac surface to the finish line at Cambrai.

Pavé sectors
No.	Name	Kilometre mark	Length (m)
7	Pont-à-Celles à Gouy-lez-Piéton	101	1800
6	Artres à Famars	175.5	1200
5	Quérénaing à Verchain-Maugré	181	1600
4	Verchain-Maugré à Saulzoir	185.5	1200
3	Saint-Python	196	1500
2	Viesly à Quiévy	198.5	3700
1	Avesnes-les-Aubert à Carnières	209	2300

At the start, a special ceremony was held involving the king of Belgium, Philippe. Once the race got underway, another four-rider breakaway was formed. It consisted of Astana's Lieuwe Westra, Thomas de Gendt of Lotto–Soudal, Perrig Quémeneur representing Team Europcar and Bretagne–Séché Environnement's Frédéric Brun. Due to the length of the stage, the riders were allowed a bigger time gap—nine minutes before Team Giant–Alpecin started the pursuit. At the intermediate sprint in Havay, which De Gendt won, the time gap was down to two minutes. Whilst they made it through the first cobbled section together, the peloton continued to speed up, and they were caught before the third sector.

In sector 4 (the first of four sectors, counting down to one) the group split into two. Fifty riders were left in the main group, which included most of the general classification favorites. The only main rider missing was Thibaut Pinot, who not only lost in the split, he also had to stop twice for equipment changes and ended up losing 3' 23" to the stage winner. Vincenzo Nibali attacked three times on the cobbled sectors, but to no avail other than getting him the most combative rider award.

None of the other cobbled sectors were sufficient to split the leaders, who prepared for a sprint finish, with riders such as Peter Sagan and John Degenkolb (winner of the cobbled classic Paris–Roubaix earlier in the year) being seen as the most likely to win. With 3.1 km (2 mi) to go, however, Tony Martin attacked. Whilst his lead reached a maximum of a few seconds, the team of race leader Chris Froome, Team Sky, were happy to give him the yellow jersey. Thus, with only Team Giant–Alpecin chasing, Martin managed to stay ahead of the bunch with a 3" advantage, taking the stage and the yellow jersey. It was seen as finally turning his luck, as he had been in second place since the start of the Tour, with time gaps of 5", 3" and 1" after each stage and to a different leader. He later said to the organisers, "It's a super nice story and it makes me super happy", and, "I'm pretty sure to stay in yellow until the Pyrenees".

Stage 4 result

Rank	Rider	Team	Time
1	Tony Martin (GER)	Etixx–Quick-Step	5h 28' 58"
2	John Degenkolb (GER)	Team Giant–Alpecin	+ 3"
3	Peter Sagan (SVK)	Tinkoff–Saxo	+ 3"
4	Greg Van Avermaet (BEL)	BMC Racing Team	+ 3"
5	Edvald Boasson Hagen (NOR)	MTN–Qhubeka	+ 3"
6	Nacer Bouhanni (FRA)	Cofidis	+ 3"
7	Jacopo Guarnieri (ITA)	Team Katusha	+ 3"
8	Tony Gallopin (FRA)	Lotto–Soudal	+ 3"
9	Zdeněk Štybar (CZE)	Etixx–Quick-Step	+ 3"
10	Bryan Coquard (FRA)	Team Europcar	+ 3"

General classification after stage 4

Rank	Rider	Team	Time
1	Tony Martin (GER)	Etixx–Quick-Step	12h 40' 26"
2	Chris Froome (GBR)	Team Sky	+ 12"
3	Tejay van Garderen (USA)	BMC Racing Team	+ 25"
4	Tony Gallopin (FRA)	Lotto–Soudal	+ 38"
5	Peter Sagan (SVK)	Tinkoff–Saxo	+ 39"
6	Greg Van Avermaet (BEL)	BMC Racing Team	+ 40"
7	Rigoberto Urán (COL)	Etixx–Quick-Step	+ 46"
8	Alberto Contador (ESP)	Tinkoff–Saxo	+ 48"
9	Geraint Thomas (GBR)	Team Sky	+ 1' 15"
10	Zdeněk Štybar (CZE)	Etixx–Quick-Step	+ 1' 16"

== Stage 5 ==
8 July 2015 — Arras to Amiens, 189.5 km (118 mi)

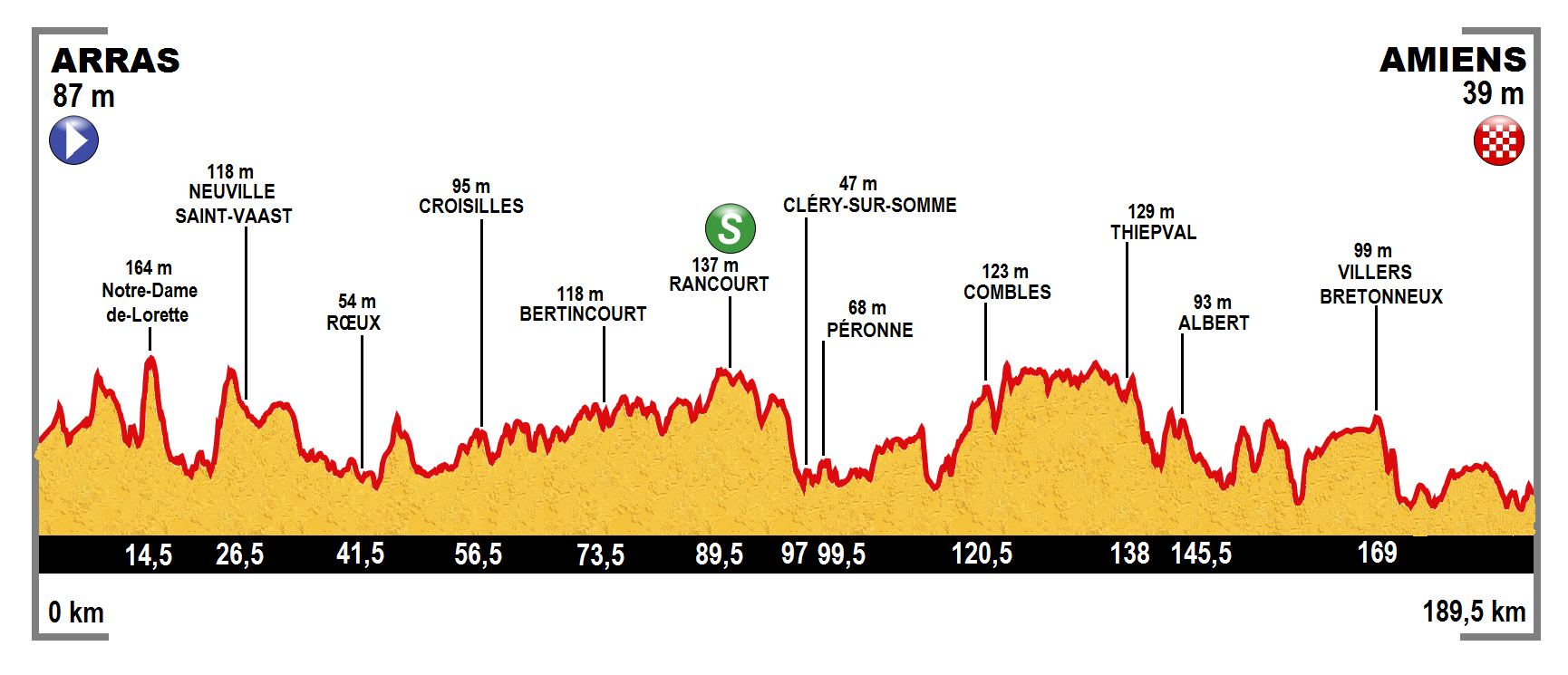
Stage 5 profile

The first full stage in France covered a relatively flat course. Expected to be the first proper stage for sprinters, the stage began in Arras and headed north to the outskirts of Lens, before turning south to head through Croisilles and Bertincourt, and on to an intermediate sprint at Rancourt. The peloton turned west at Peronne taking a circuitous route to Albert and on south to Lamotte-Warfusée. The race then continued west into Amiens.

The stage was dedicated to the British and Commonwealth soldiers who died during World War I, with sites such as the Arras Memorial, the Canadian National Vimy Memorial, the British cemetery of Sailly-Saillisel, Rancourt Necropolis (as mentioned, home of the intermediate sprint), the Museum of the Great War, the Longueval cemetery of the Commonwealth War Graves Commission, the Delville Wood South African National Memorial, the Franco-British memorial at Thiepval and the Villers–Bretonneux Australian National Memorial being visited during the stage.

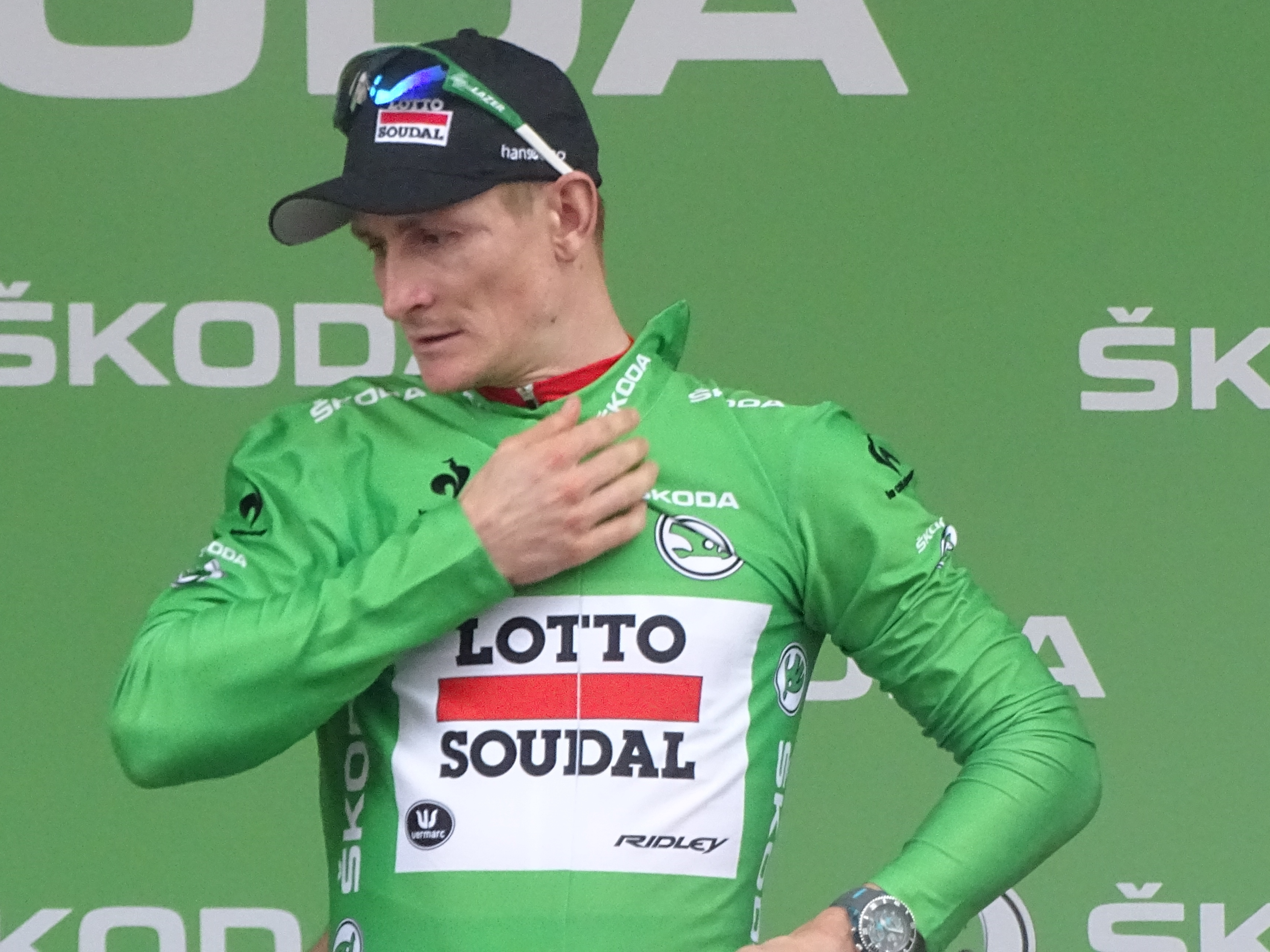
André Greipel, pictured after stage four, took the victory and put on the green jersey on the podium.

It was a rainy and windy day on this stage of the Tour. At the beginning of the race, Nicolas Edet (Cofidis) and Pierre-Luc Périchon (Bretagne–Séché Environnement) escaped. Edet soon folded back to the bunch, leaving Périchon in the headwind alone. Meanwhile, crashes were occurring in the bunch, notably one that forced Nacer Bouhanni (Cofidis) out of the race after aggravating injuries sustained in the French National Road Race Championships. After some minor gaps, a definite split was caused by the crosswinds, catching out Ryder Hesjedal (Cannondale–Garmin) and Team Sky's riders Richie Porte and Peter Kennaugh. This group would ultimately come in 14' 15" in arrears.

Périchon was caught with 96 km (60 mi) to cover and nobody tried his luck from that point. A bunch sprint organized itself with all the main sprinters present. André Greipel of Lotto–Soudal won it to bank his second victory at this Tour de France, with second place belonging to Peter Sagan (Tinkoff–Saxo) who made a late surge for the line. Mark Cavendish (Etixx–Quick-Step) rounded off the podium. The "most combative" award was given to Michael Matthews (Orica–GreenEDGE), who fought on to finish the stage despite riding with two broken ribs. Tony Martin's (Etixx–Quick-Step) overall lead was unchanged.

"It was quite an interesting sprint as no one of the sprinters had a real lead-out man in the last 400 metres", Greipel said after the stage. "So everybody had to time the sprint somehow and find the right position."

Stage 5 result

Rank	Rider	Team	Time
1	André Greipel (GER)	Lotto–Soudal	4h 39' 00"
2	Peter Sagan (SVK)	Tinkoff–Saxo	+ 0"
3	Mark Cavendish (GBR)	Etixx–Quick-Step	+ 0"
4	Alexander Kristoff (NOR)	Team Katusha	+ 0"
5	Edvald Boasson Hagen (NOR)	MTN–Qhubeka	+ 0"
6	John Degenkolb (GER)	Team Giant–Alpecin	+ 0"
7	Arnaud Démare (FRA)	FDJ	+ 0"
8	Bryan Coquard (FRA)	Team Europcar	+ 0"
9	Davide Cimolai (ITA)	Lampre–Merida	+ 0"
10	Greg Van Avermaet (BEL)	BMC Racing Team	+ 0"

General classification after stage 5

Rank	Rider	Team	Time
1	Tony Martin (GER)	Etixx–Quick-Step	17h 19' 26"
2	Chris Froome (GBR)	Team Sky	+ 12"
3	Tejay van Garderen (USA)	BMC Racing Team	+ 25"
4	Peter Sagan (SVK)	Tinkoff–Saxo	+ 33"
5	Tony Gallopin (FRA)	Lotto–Soudal	+ 38"
6	Greg Van Avermaet (BEL)	BMC Racing Team	+ 40"
7	Rigoberto Urán (COL)	Etixx–Quick-Step	+ 46"
8	Alberto Contador (ESP)	Tinkoff–Saxo	+ 48"
9	Geraint Thomas (GBR)	Team Sky	+ 1' 15"
10	Zdeněk Štybar (CZE)	Etixx–Quick-Step	+ 1' 16"

== Stage 6 ==
9 July 2015 — Abbeville to Le Havre, 191.5 km (119 mi)

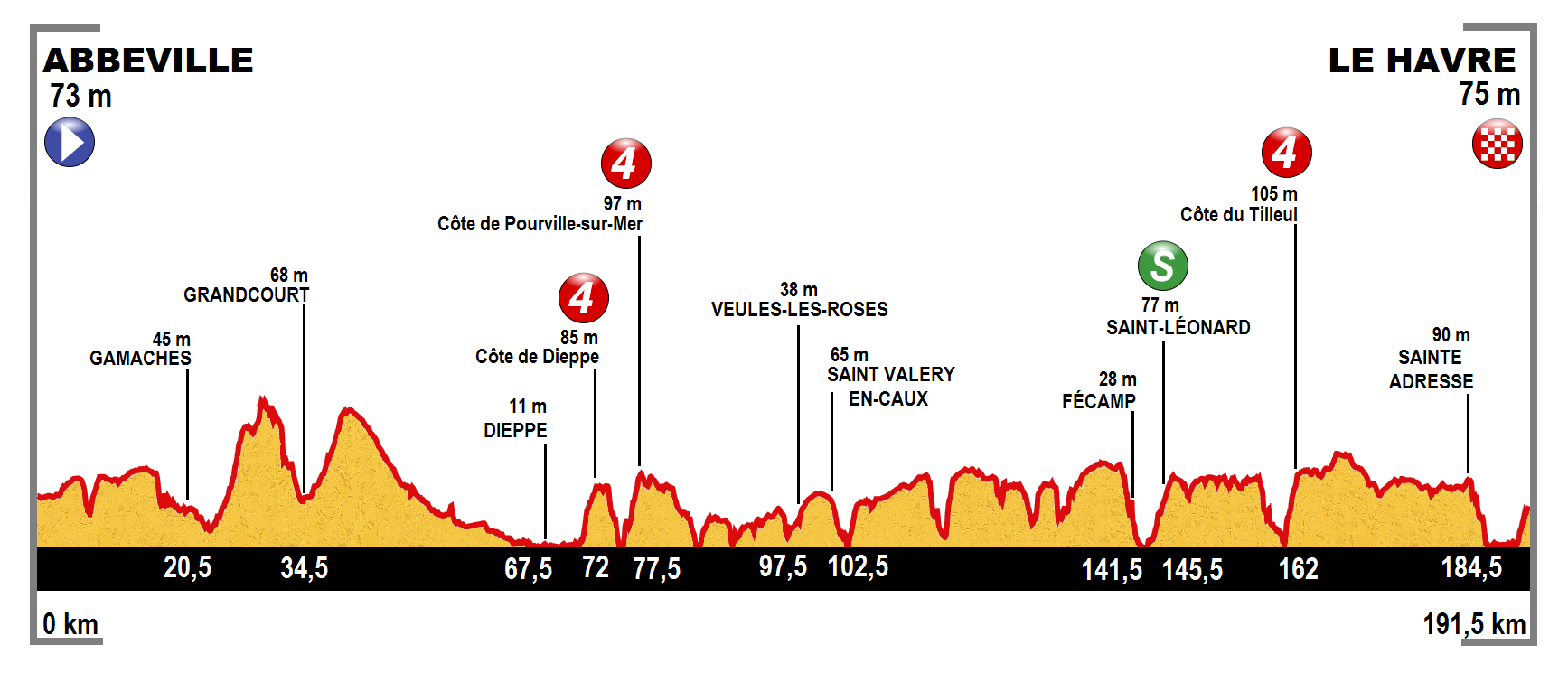
Stage 6 profile

The stage departed from Abbeville and headed west to Dieppe, which was followed quickly by two category 4 climbs, the Côte de Dieppe and the Côte de Pourville-sur-Mer. The peloton then continued west along the English Channel coast to Saint-Valery-en-Caux, then on to Fécamp, which was followed by an intermediate sprint at Saint-Léonard. The race continued to Étretat, which was followed quickly by the category 4 climb of the Côte de Tilleul. The peloton continued south along the coast to Sainte-Adresse on the outskirts of Le Havre. This stage did not have a typical sprint finish, as there was an incline up to the finish line in Le Havre.

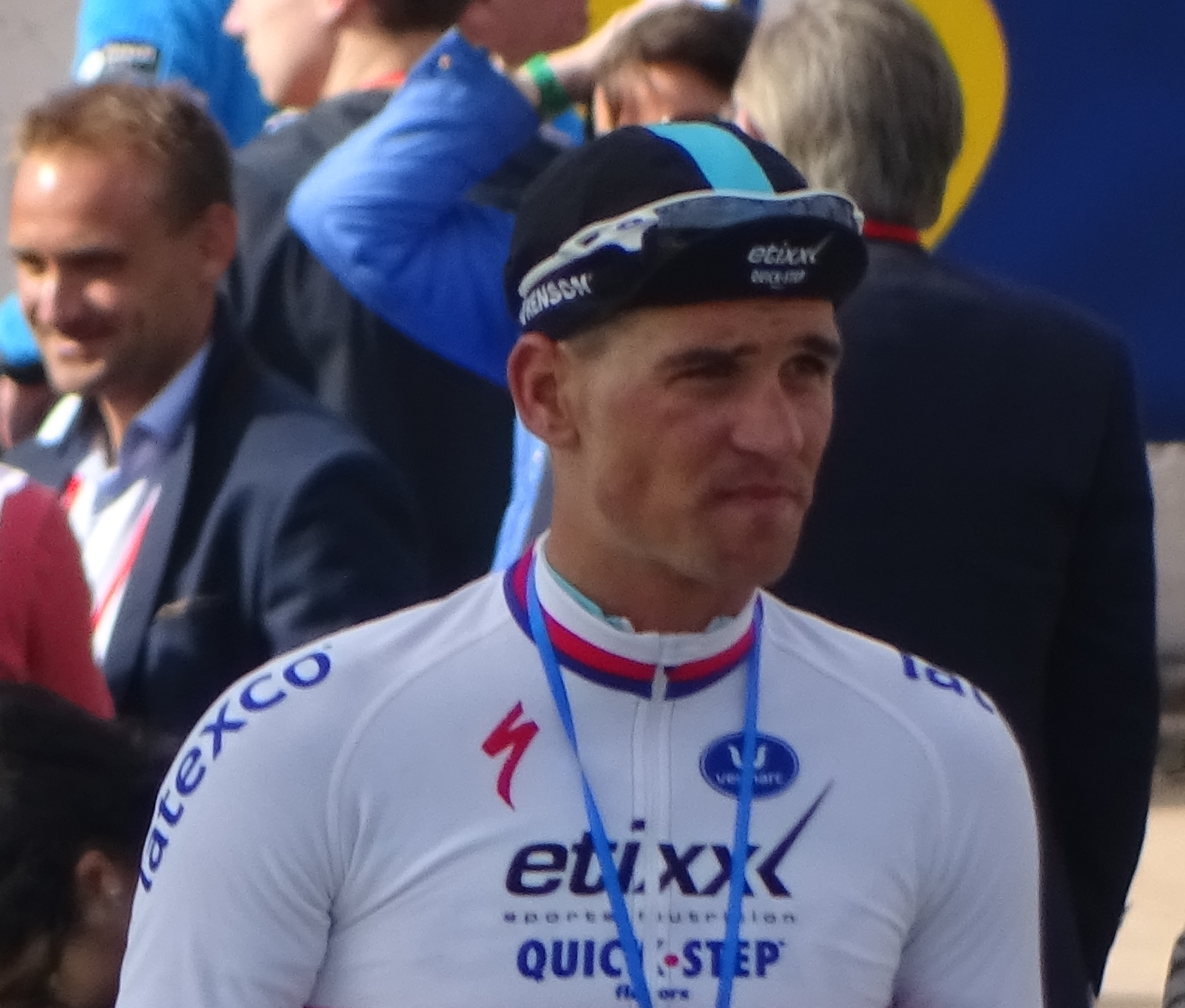
Zdeněk Štybar surprised the leading group. He is pictured here at the 2015 Paris–Roubaix.

The day's breakaway was formed not too long after the start, and consisted of Team Europcar's Perrig Quéméneur, Cofidis' Kenneth Vanbilsen and Daniel Teklehaimanot of MTN–Qhubeka. The peloton, recovering from the crashes in the previous stages, had a rather slow speed, and thus the trio of riders were allowed a lead which topped 12'30" before Lotto–Soudal started pursuit. Teklehaimanot took the available points at the three climbs which meant he took the polka-dot jersey as leader of the mountains classification, becoming the first black African to do so. Towards the end, the breakaway split, with Vanbilsen trying an attack for the day's combativity award (it actually went to Quéméneur). Quéméneur and Teklehaimanot were caught with 10 km (6 mi) to go, whilst the Cofidis rider still had an advantage of 25". He was ultimately caught with 3 km (2 mi) to go and the peloton prepared for a finish.

The stage finished on a short incline (850 m (2,789 ft) at an average 7%), then there was 500 m (1,640 ft) of flat terrain to the line. With about 900 m (2,953 ft) to go, a crash occurred in the peloton, causing race leader Tony Martin and general classification favorite Vincenzo Nibali to fall. Zdeněk Štybar took advantage of this, as he jumped from the peloton amidst all the confusion and took a stage win, finishing two seconds ahead of the group. Peter Sagan was left in the chasing position behind, but refused to take on the workload as there were teams with more than one unit in the group. He finished second.

Štybar later said "I have mixed feelings after winning this stage because Tony Martin crashed". In the evening, it was announced that Martin suffered a broken collarbone and would be unable to start the next stage, as he was flying to Hamburg for surgery.

Stage 6 result

Rank	Rider	Team	Time
1	Zdeněk Štybar (CZE)	Etixx–Quick-Step	4h 53' 46"
2	Peter Sagan (SVK)	Tinkoff–Saxo	+ 2"
3	Bryan Coquard (FRA)	Team Europcar	+ 2"
4	John Degenkolb (GER)	Team Giant–Alpecin	+ 2"
5	Greg Van Avermaet (BEL)	BMC Racing Team	+ 2"
6	Tony Gallopin (FRA)	Lotto–Soudal	+ 2"
7	Edvald Boasson Hagen (NOR)	MTN–Qhubeka	+ 2"
8	Davide Cimolai (ITA)	Lampre–Merida	+ 2"
9	Julien Simon (FRA)	Cofidis	+ 2"
10	Gorka Izagirre (ESP)	Movistar Team	+ 2"

General classification after stage 6

Rank	Rider	Team	Time
1	Tony Martin (GER)	Etixx–Quick-Step	22h 13' 14"
2	Chris Froome (GBR)	Team Sky	+ 12"
3	Tejay van Garderen (USA)	BMC Racing Team	+ 25"
4	Peter Sagan (SVK)	Tinkoff–Saxo	+ 27"
5	Tony Gallopin (FRA)	Lotto–Soudal	+ 38"
6	Greg Van Avermaet (BEL)	BMC Racing Team	+ 40"
7	Rigoberto Urán (COL)	Etixx–Quick-Step	+ 46"
8	Alberto Contador (ESP)	Tinkoff–Saxo	+ 48"
9	Zdeněk Štybar (CZE)	Etixx–Quick-Step	+ 1' 04"
10	Geraint Thomas (GBR)	Team Sky	+ 1' 15"

== Stage 7 ==
10 July 2015 — Livarot to Fougères, 190.5 km (118 mi)

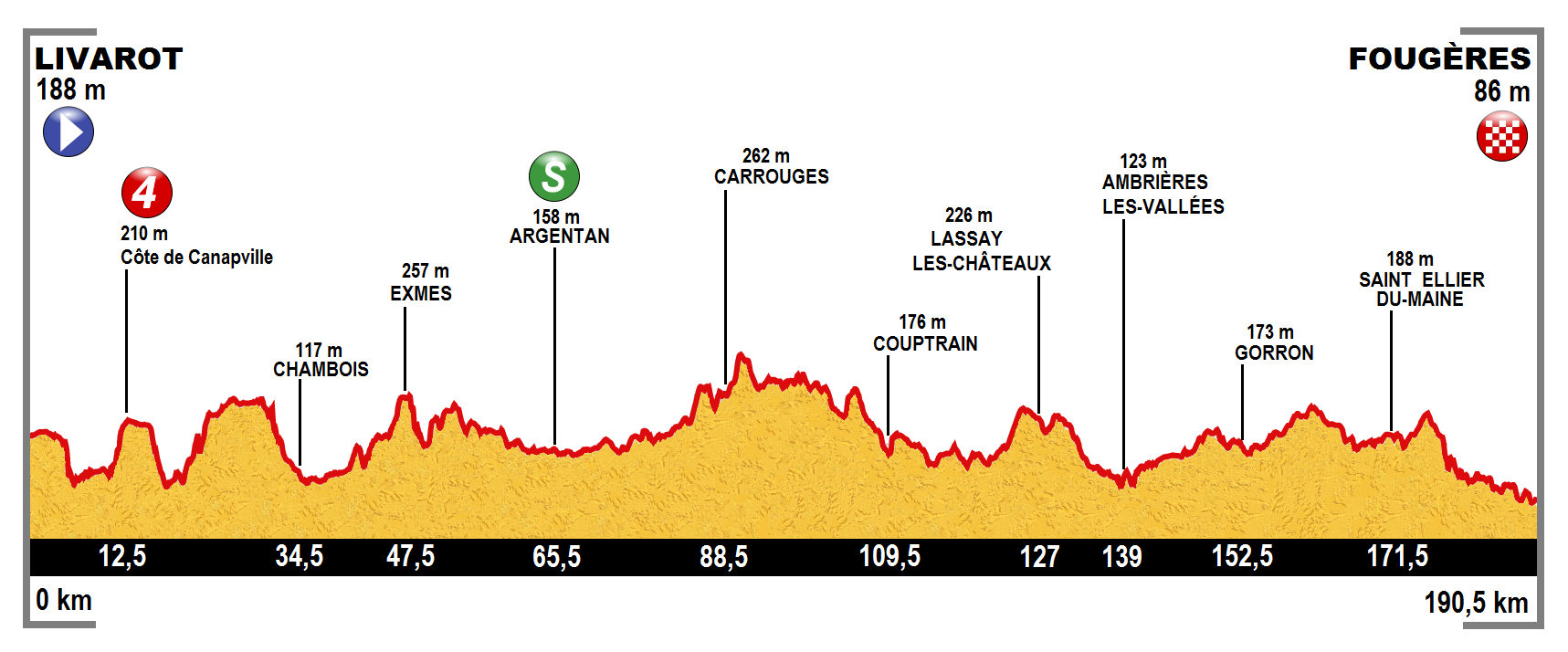
Stage 7 profile

The riders departed from Livarot, the first time the commune was used for the start or finish of a stage, in another stage for the sprinters. The race quickly headed over the category 4 Côte de Canapville and on through Vimoutiers and Argentan, where an intermediate sprint took place. After heading south-west to Saint-Martin-des-Landes, the peloton then headed west through Lassay-les-Chateaux, Ambrières-les-Vallées and Gorron before heading into Fougères. After his crash the day before, the leader Tony Martin had to withdraw from the race, meaning no-one wore the yellow jersey in this stage. Before the stage, number one general classification rider Froome said: "Out of respect for Tony I would never have worn it in any case. That's not the way to get the yellow jersey, due to someone else's misfortunes." There was another non-starter, Greg Henderson of Lotto–Soudal, because of two broken ribs.

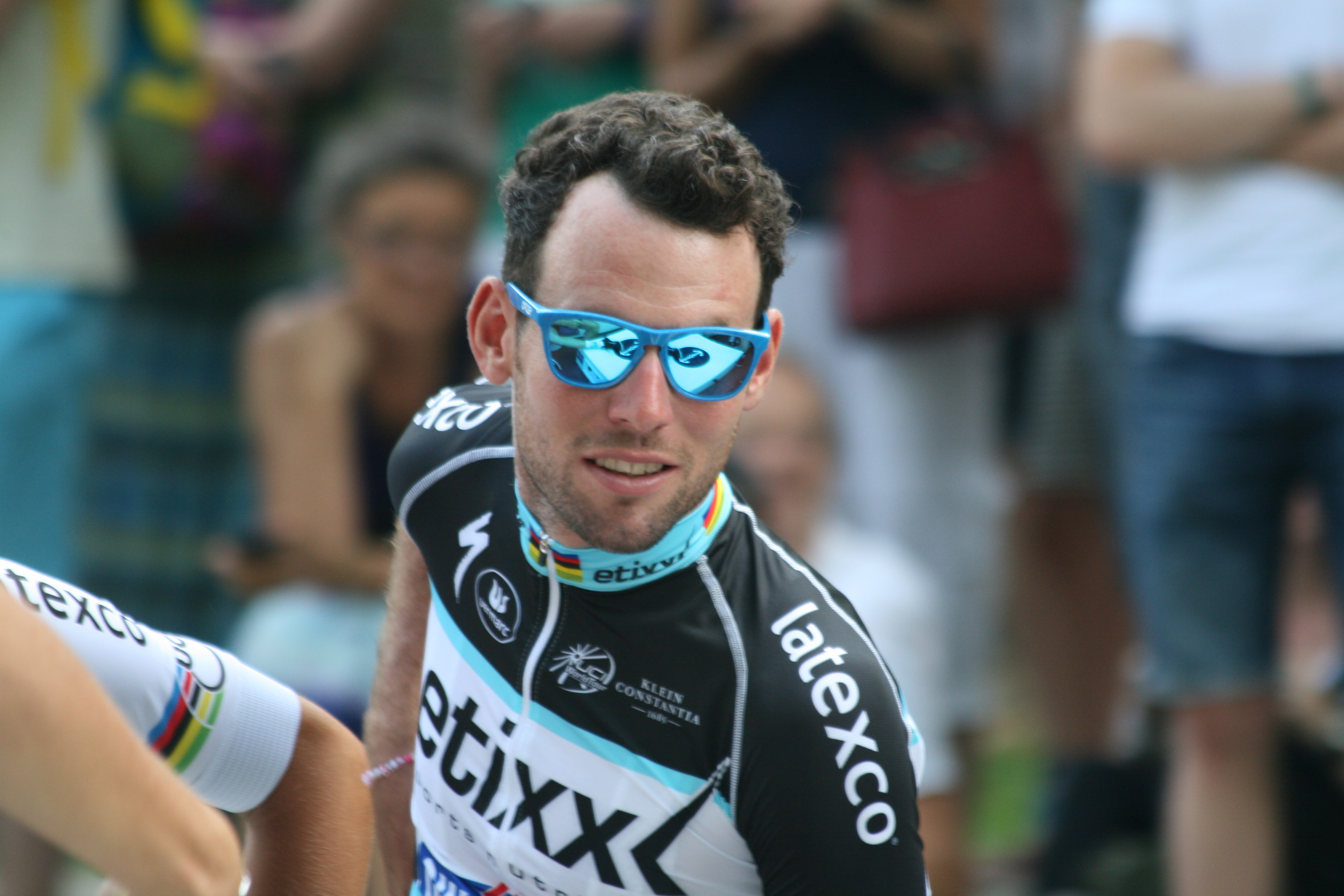
Etixx–Quick-Step's Mark Cavendish, pictured here at the team presentation, won stage six's bunch sprint.

The stage was disputed under good weather conditions. During the neutral zone before the start, Alberto Contador and Robert Gesink of LottoNL–Jumbo went down on the asphalt but didn't sustain any injuries. Once the flag was dropped to start the race, five riders came through as the day's breakaway – the mountains classification leader Daniel Teklehaimanot, Kristijan Đurasek of Lampre–Merida, Cofidis' Luis Ángel Maté and two riders from the local Bretagne–Séché Environnement team – Anthony Delaplace and Brice Feillu. Teklehaimanot took full points on the only categorised climb of the day. Meanwhile, Lotto–Soudal and Etixx–Quick-Step heavily controlled the pace of the peloton, in an attempt for their sprinters to try and fight for the stage. Thus, the breakaway's lead only topped four minutes. Despite this, the five at the front proved very difficult to catch, as they were caught with only 11 km (7 mi) until the finish.

At the finish, Mark Cavendish, André Greipel, Peter Sagan and John Degenkolb all went for the final sprint, and were practically neck and neck until the finish, when Cavendish caught Greipel's slipstream and took his 26th success at the tour, and his first for nearly two years. Greipel managed second and Sagan took third. The 'Manx Missile', as Cavendish is known, dedicated the victory to his teammate Tony Martin, who was recuperating from a collarbone operation. Froome regained the yellow jersey. After the stage, it was announced that Luca Paolini (Team Katusha) had tested positive for cocaine and was excluded from the race.

Stage 7 result

Rank	Rider	Team	Time
1	Mark Cavendish (GBR)	Etixx–Quick-Step	4h 27' 25"
2	André Greipel (GER)	Lotto–Soudal	+ 0"
3	Peter Sagan (SVK)	Tinkoff–Saxo	+ 0"
4	John Degenkolb (GER)	Team Giant–Alpecin	+ 0"
5	Alexander Kristoff (NOR)	Team Katusha	+ 0"
6	Arnaud Démare (FRA)	FDJ	+ 0"
7	Tyler Farrar (USA)	MTN–Qhubeka	+ 0"
8	Reinardt Janse van Rensburg (RSA)	MTN–Qhubeka	+ 0"
9	Davide Cimolai (ITA)	Lampre–Merida	+ 0"
10	Sam Bennett (IRL)	Bora–Argon 18	+ 0"

General classification after stage 7

Rank	Rider	Team	Time
1	Chris Froome (GBR)	Team Sky	26h 40' 51"
2	Peter Sagan (SVK)	Tinkoff–Saxo	+ 11"
3	Tejay van Garderen (USA)	BMC Racing Team	+ 13"
4	Tony Gallopin (FRA)	Lotto–Soudal	+ 26"
5	Greg Van Avermaet (BEL)	BMC Racing Team	+ 28"
6	Rigoberto Urán (COL)	Etixx–Quick-Step	+ 34"
7	Alberto Contador (ESP)	Tinkoff–Saxo	+ 36"
8	Zdeněk Štybar (CZE)	Etixx–Quick-Step	+ 52"
9	Geraint Thomas (GBR)	Team Sky	+ 1' 03"
10	Warren Barguil (FRA)	Team Giant–Alpecin	+ 1' 07"

== Stage 8 ==
11 July 2015 — Rennes to Mûr-de-Bretagne, 181.5 km (113 mi)

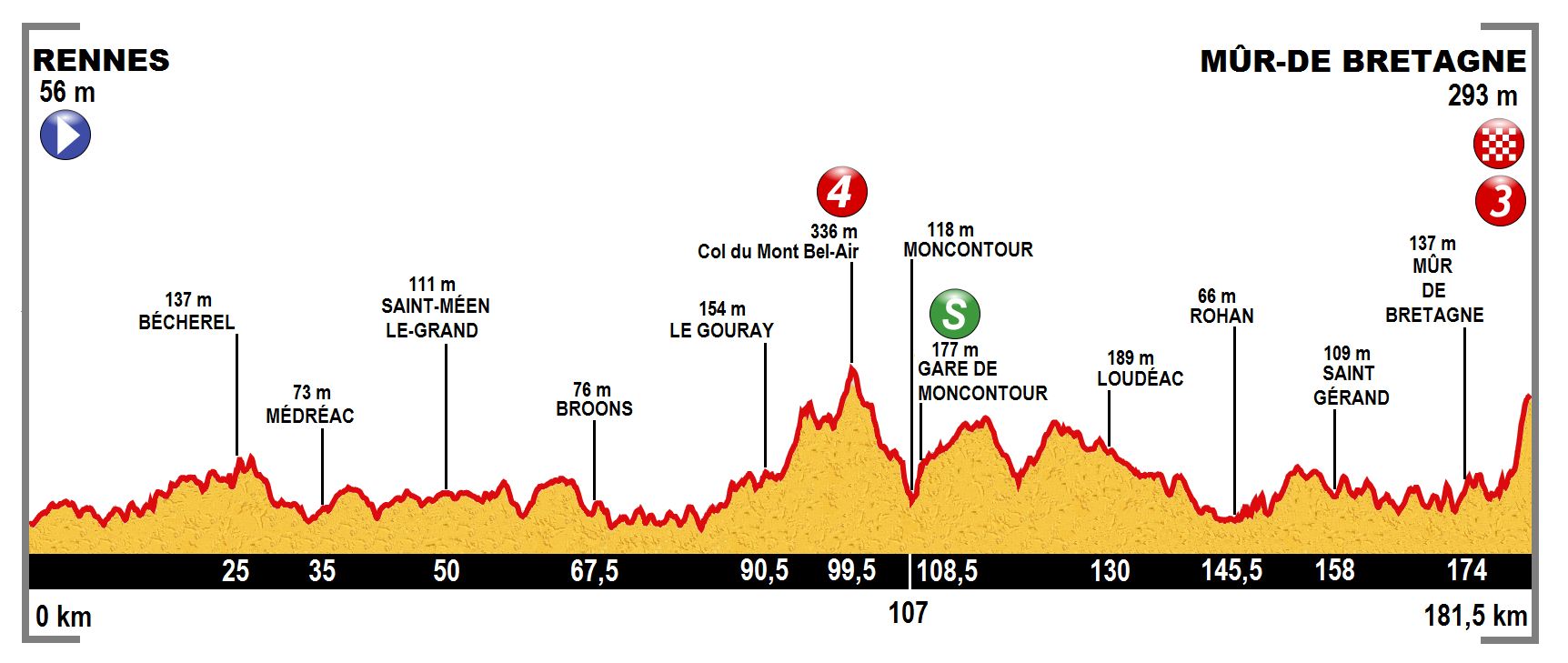
Stage 8 profile

The riders leaving Rennes at the start of the stage eight

The peloton headed out of Rennes with racing officially starting at Montgermont, heading north-west to Bécherel, west to Saint-Méen-le-Grand, and then north-west again to Plénée-Jugon. This was followed by the category 4 Col du Mont Bel-Air and an intermediate sprint at Moncontour. The race then headed south through Loudéac to Rohan and turned west to Neulliac. The peloton continued to Mûr-de-Bretagne, travelling through the commune before arriving at the final climb for the day. The category 3 climb of Mûr-de-Bretagne, up to the finish line, was 2 kilometres (1.2 mi) at a gradient of 6.9%.

Four riders attacked at km 0 and became the day's breakaway. These riders were Pierre-Luc Périchon of Bretagne–Séché Environnement, Bartosz Huzarski of Bora–Argon 18, IAM Cycling's Sylvain Chavanel and Romain Sicard of Team Europcar. Their maximum lead reached four minutes before Lotto–Soudal took up pursuit at the head of the peloton. At the intermediate sprint, a group of 17 riders went clear of the peloton. They joined the initial breakaway, before Huzarski attacked again, this time taking Lotto–Soudal's Lars Bak and Etixx–Quick-Step's Michał Gołaś with him. The lead of these riders reached 1'12". Huzarski (the recipient of the day's combativity award) gave up with 10 km (6 mi) to go, but Bak and Gołaś continued fighting. However, they only managed to last another 2 km (1 mi) before being brought back by the peloton.

At the Mûr-de-Bretagne, Froome led the peloton, but was unable to keep going for a stage victory, as Alexis Vuillermoz attacked with 800 m (2,625 ft) to go and managed to take the stage victory for himself It was the first French triumph in this year's Tour. He later said "After winning I thought about my dad who died three years ago. He was the one who got me interested in the Tour de France, he used to take my cousins and I to the side of the road to watch the Tour go past", said Vuillermoz. "I hope today he's proud of me." Dan Martin came in second position, after trying an attack but leaving it until too late. Nibali lost ten seconds to all GC contenders, and later said "I had a bad day. I felt good at the beginning of the stage but at the end, I couldn’t feel anything anymore, I didn’t have any legs anymore." Peter Sagan grabbed the green jersey by three points as André Greipel didn't feature in the finish.

After the stage, the UCI proceeded to randomly check five riders' bicycles for hidden motors as a part of the mandatory control efforts. All passed inspection as nothing was found.

Stage 8 result

Rank	Rider	Team	Time
1	Alexis Vuillermoz (FRA)	AG2R La Mondiale	4h 20' 55"
2	Dan Martin (IRL)	Cannondale–Garmin	+ 5"
3	Alejandro Valverde (ESP)	Movistar Team	+ 10"
4	Peter Sagan (SVK)	Tinkoff–Saxo	+ 10"
5	Tony Gallopin (FRA)	Lotto–Soudal	+ 10"
6	Greg Van Avermaet (BEL)	BMC Racing Team	+ 10"
7	Adam Yates (GBR)	Orica–GreenEDGE	+ 10"
8	Chris Froome (GBR)	Team Sky	+ 10"
9	Bauke Mollema (NED)	Trek Factory Racing	+ 10"
10	Tejay van Garderen (USA)	BMC Racing Team	+ 10"

General classification after stage 8

Rank	Rider	Team	Time
1	Chris Froome (GBR)	Team Sky	31h 01' 56"
2	Peter Sagan (SVK)	Tinkoff–Saxo	+ 11"
3	Tejay van Garderen (USA)	BMC Racing Team	+ 13"
4	Tony Gallopin (FRA)	Lotto–Soudal	+ 26"
5	Greg Van Avermaet (BEL)	BMC Racing Team	+ 28"
6	Rigoberto Urán (COL)	Etixx–Quick-Step	+ 34"
7	Alberto Contador (ESP)	Tinkoff–Saxo	+ 36"
8	Warren Barguil (FRA)	Team Giant–Alpecin	+ 1' 07"
9	Zdeněk Štybar (CZE)	Etixx–Quick-Step	+ 1' 15"
10	Bauke Mollema (NED)	Trek Factory Racing	+ 1' 32"

== Stage 9 ==
12 July 2015 — Vannes to Plumelec, 28 km (17 mi) team time trial (TTT)

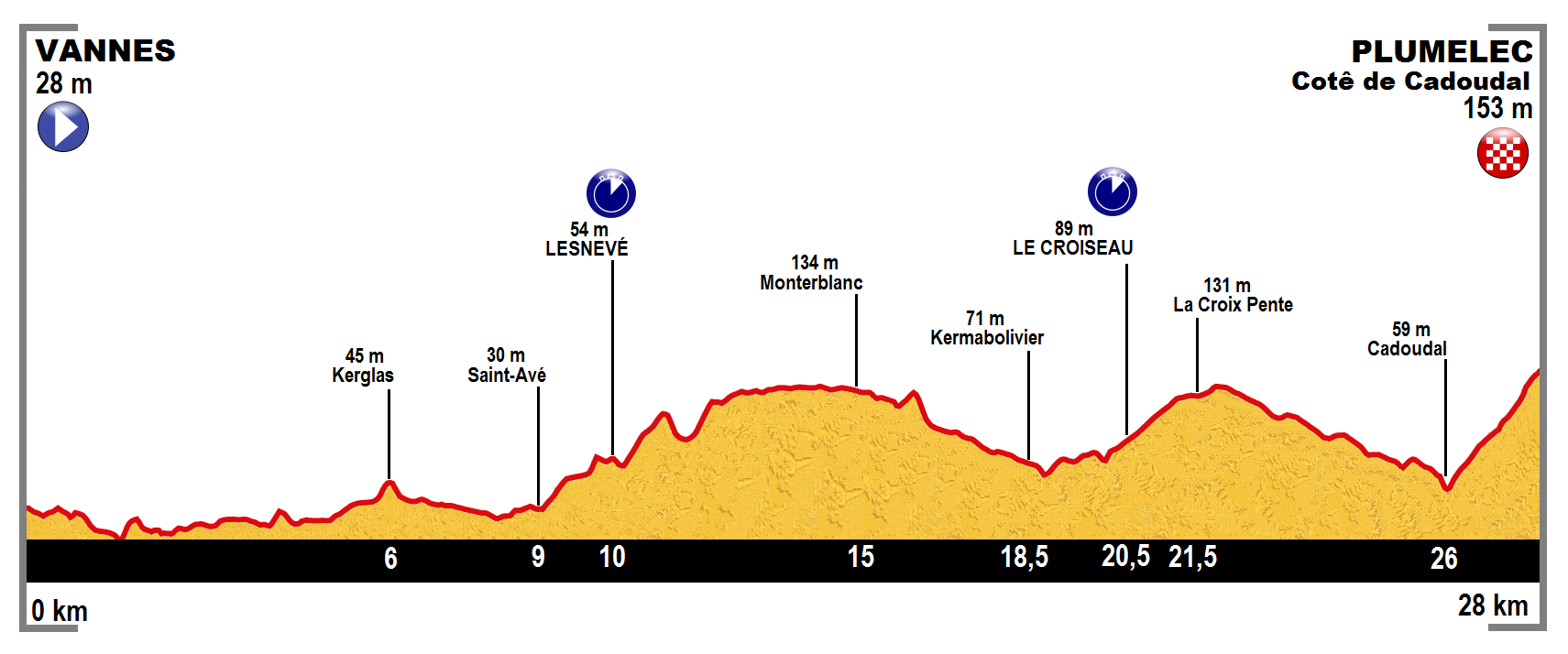
Stage 9 profile

There had not been a team time trial (TTT) this late into the Tour de France since 1982. TTT stages in the Tour usually take place in opening days because of the likelihood that all of the team's riders would still be participating. The teams started in the reverse order that they were placed in the team classification, with the exception of the team which included the general classification leader, which was Chris Froome's Team Sky, who started last. In this stage, the teams had to have five riders crossing the finish line, and the time of this fifth cyclist was the one that counted. The teams departed from Vannes, heading north-east to the first time check at Lesneve on the outskirt of Saint-Avé, bearing north through Monterblanc and on to the second time check at Le Croiseau on the outskirt of Plaudren. The end of the stage provided a 1.7 km (1.1 mi) climb up the Côte de Cadoudal at an average gradient of 6.2%, before the finish in Plumelec.

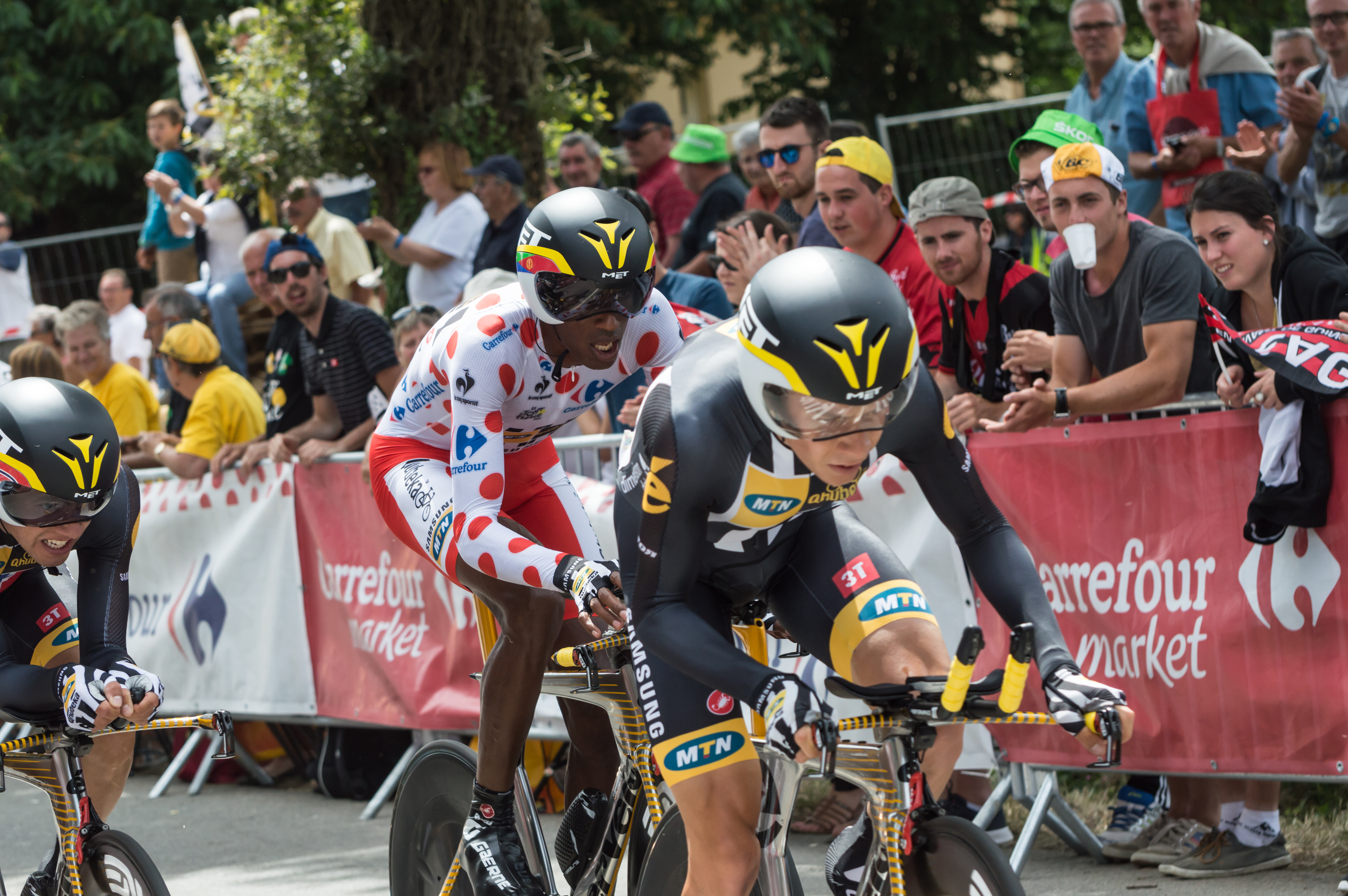
MTN–Qhubeka riders coming into the finish of stage nine's team time trial

Orica–GreenEDGE were the first to start, but only had six riders left and put in the worst performance, with a time of 37'13". Simon Yates called it a "rest day" and told the press he did not go over 75% of his capabilities during the stage. The next team to start, Bretagne–Séché Environnement beat them, with a time of 34'01". Lampre–Merida were the next leaders, after going 58" faster than the French team, before being beaten by Vincenzo Nibali's Astana, who arrived in a time of 32'50". Twenty minutes later, Nairo Quintana's Movistar Team took the reins at the finish, before being beaten by BMC Racing Team, who were four seconds faster. Leader Chris Froome's Team Sky, who struggled to maintain a five-men group together at the end of the stage, finished a mere second after the Americans, who took a stage win. Tinkoff–Saxo had a chance to earn the yellow jersey for Peter Sagan, but instead came in fourth with a time deficit of 28 seconds on BMC. Cannondale–Garmin came in with a 1' 29" deficit, which could prove difficult to overcome for their leader Andrew Talansky, now sitting in 19th position in the overall classification at 4' 17". Froome kept the yellow jersey with an advantage of twelve seconds over Tejay van Garderen. Van Garderen later said "We knew we were on a really good ride", and "In a perfect world, we would have taken the stage and the yellow jersey. But we will take the stage win. Honestly, I couldn't be happier."

Stage 9 result

Rank	Team	Time
1	BMC Racing Team	32' 15"
2	Team Sky	+ 1"
3	Movistar Team	+ 4"
4	Tinkoff–Saxo	+ 28"
5	Astana	+ 35"
6	IAM Cycling	+ 38"
7	Etixx–Quick-Step	+ 45"
8	Lampre–Merida	+ 48"
9	LottoNL–Jumbo	+ 1' 14"
10	AG2R La Mondiale	+ 1' 24"

General classification after stage 9

Rank	Rider	Team	Time
1	Chris Froome (GBR)	Team Sky	31h 34' 12"
2	Tejay van Garderen (USA)	BMC Racing Team	+ 12"
3	Greg Van Avermaet (BEL)	BMC Racing Team	+ 27"
4	Peter Sagan (SVK)	Tinkoff–Saxo	+ 38"
5	Alberto Contador (ESP)	Tinkoff–Saxo	+ 1' 03"
6	Rigoberto Urán (COL)	Etixx–Quick-Step	+ 1' 18"
7	Alejandro Valverde (ESP)	Movistar Team	+ 1' 50"
8	Geraint Thomas (GBR)	Team Sky	+ 1' 52"
9	Nairo Quintana (COL)	Movistar Team	+ 1' 59"
10	Zdeněk Štybar (CZE)	Etixx–Quick-Step	+ 1' 59"

== Rest day 1 ==
13 July 2015 — Pau

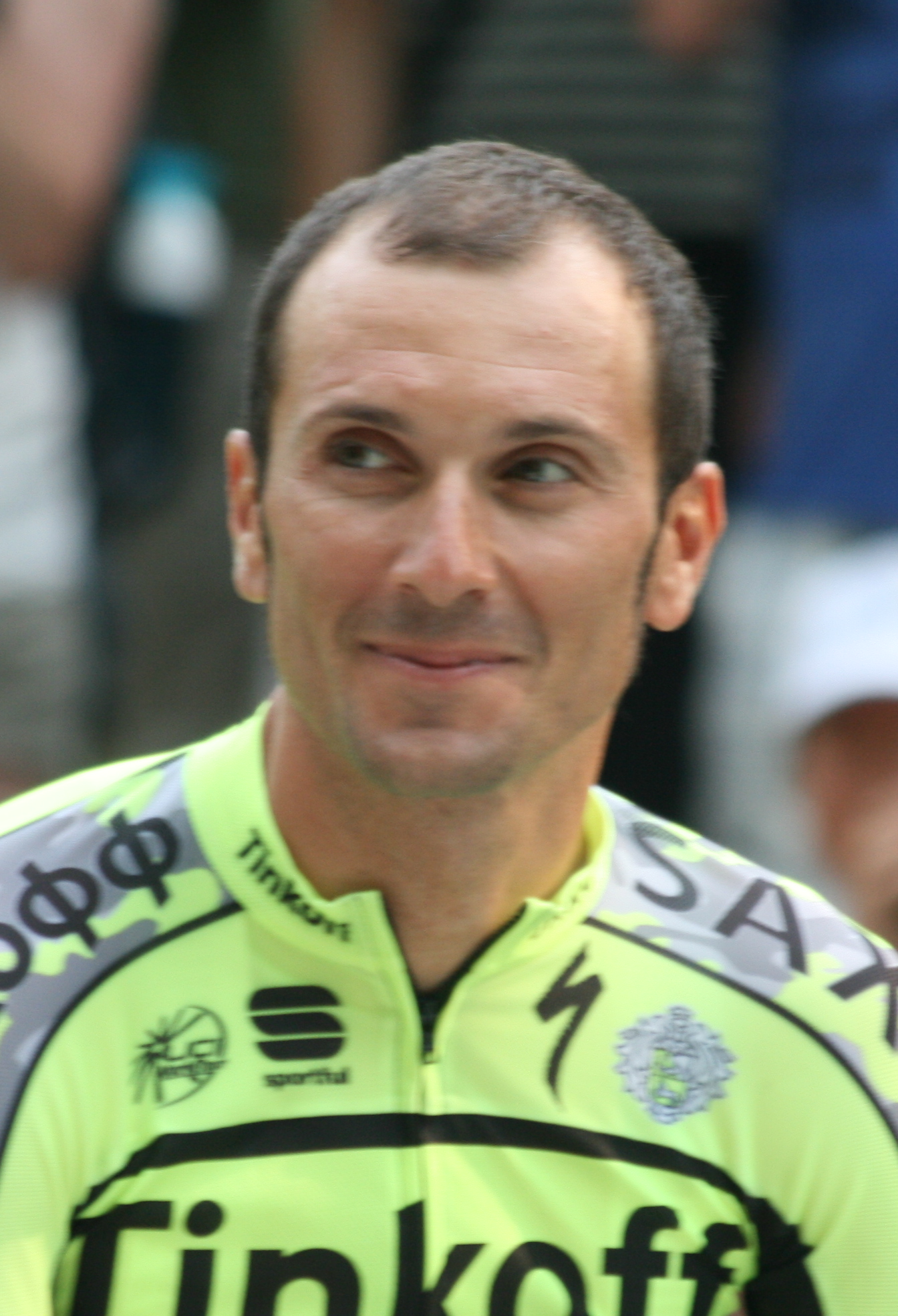
Tinkoff–Saxo's Ivan Basso, pictured here at the Tour's team presentation, quit the race on the first rest day after being diagnosed with testicular cancer.

The riders transferred to Pau for the rest day. Ivan Basso of the Tinkoff–Saxo team announced that he had been diagnosed with testicular cancer and that he was withdrawing from the race. His road captain, Alberto Contador, was emotional when talking to the press and Basso received support from a number of people including Lance Armstrong. Basso made the announcement in English to the media: "I have a bad announcement to give to you guys. On stage 5, I had a really small crash but in the crash I touched my testicle on the saddle and for a few days, I felt a small pain. Yesterday we spoke with the doctor of the Tour de France and we decided to go to make a special analysis in the hospital and the examination gave me bad news. I have a small cancer in the left testicle."

About the race, race leader Chris Froome (Team Sky) said: "This first week, the big thing was not to lose any time. So to gain quite substantial amounts of time, that is the dream scenario. I have my team to thank for that. They have been there every step of the way, after all these one-day Classics I couldn’t be in a better position."

Alberto Contador (Tinkoff–Saxo) did not lament his time deficit: "We’ll see how everyone is in the mountains. I believe that a lot is still to happen in this Tour and everybody will have días malos, bad days. Hopefully we will have none", said the Spaniard. "This Tour will be won by regularity and I hope that this favours me."

Nairo Quintana of Movistar Team was sitting ninth on the general classification at 1' 59" and reflected: "The roster is still full, with a couple of crashes yet with no major complications, and performing really well, as everyone could see yesterday in the team time trial. I think that the Pyrenees, with Alejandro and all of them by my side, will be a good opportunity to turn things around in our favour."

Tejay van Garderen (BMC Racing Team) said about the mountains to come: "I don’t think my strength is going to be flying up the road and dropping people like Quintana and Contador, my strength is going to be my consistency", said the American. "In the Pyrenees I’m going to have to mark the guys who are important and take the opportunity if it's there."

Vincenzo Nibali of the Astana squad was shocked by the news of his fellow countryman Basso's cancer. He nonetheless talked about the upcoming race in those terms: "I want to see if the real Nibali is around. More than anything, I want some answers for myself. I still haven’t felt as good as I did last year, I hope it happens starting from tomorrow (Tuesday). Will I attack? We’ll see.... If there's a chance, why not?"

== Stage 10 ==
14 July 2015 — Tarbes to La Pierre-Saint-Martin, 167 km (104 mi)

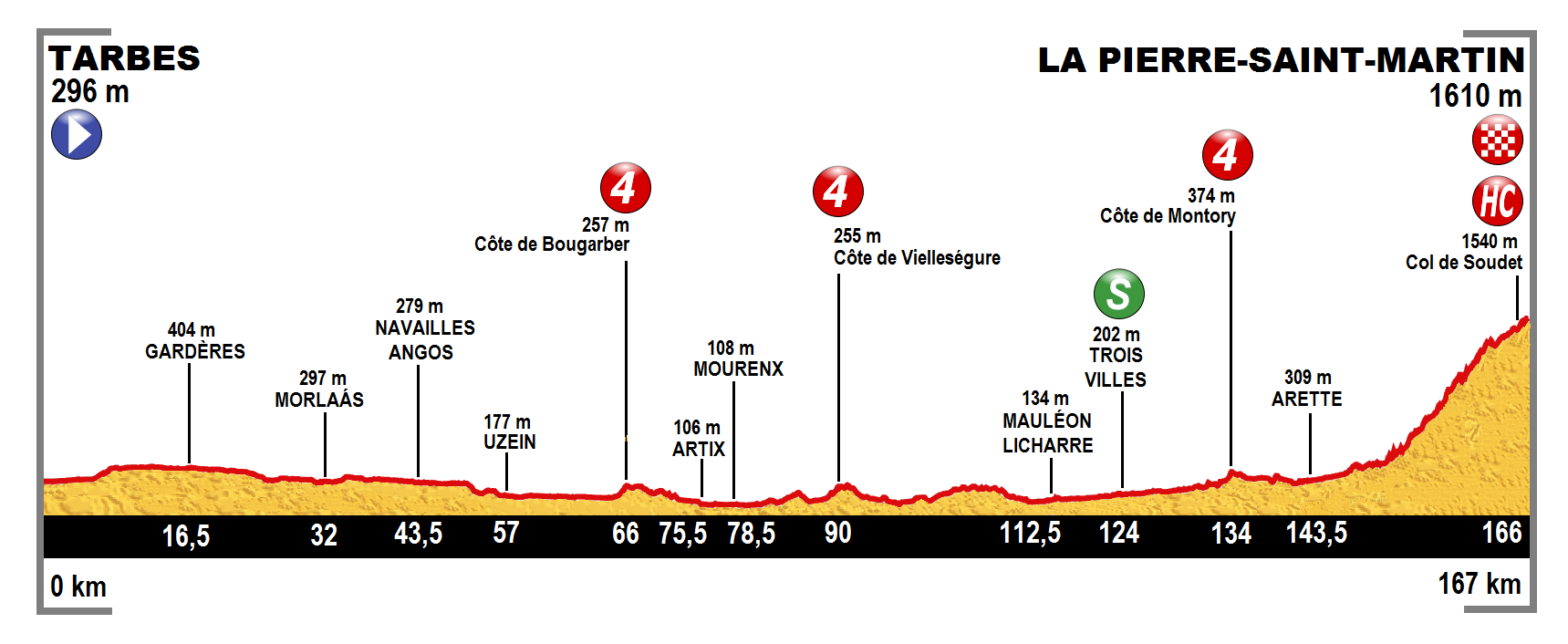
Stage 10 profile

Bastille Day featured the first mountainous stage of the 2015 Tour, departing from Tarbes, with racing officially starting at Bordères-sur-l'Échez. The peloton travelled west through Morlaàs, over the category 4 Côte de Bougarber to Mourenx, and then over the category 4 Côte de Vielleségure to Navarrenx. The peloton then headed south-west to Mauléon-Licharre, then south to a sprint at Trois-Villes and on to Tardets-Sorholus. The race then turned east and headed over the category 4 Côte de Montory to Arette, before turning south once again to begin the Hors catégorie 15.3 kilometres (9.5 mi) climb up to La Pierre-Saint-Martin at 1,610 metres (5,280 ft). The average gradient of this first major climb of the Tour is 7.4%.

Pierrick Fédrigo (Bretagne–Séché Environnement) broke away first and was joined after 45 km (28 mi) of racing by Kenneth Vanbilsen (Cofidis). They amassed the points at the intermediate sprint, but the battle got heated after their passage with André Greipel winning the sprint. He would eventually take back the green jersey from Sagan. Shortly after the beginning of the final climb, the break was swept up by the leading group. The climb had barely started when polkadot jersey wearer Daniel Teklehaimanot (MTN–Qhubeka) was dropped, along with Kwiatkowski. Soon, Thibaut Pinot and Jean-Christophe Péraud, the third and second overall of last year's Tour respectively were distanced too.

A select group of twelve riders resisted with 10 km (6 mi) to cover, at which point Nibali was distanced. Chris Froome (Team Sky) attacked with 6.4 km (4 mi) remaining, as there was only Nairo Quintana and teammate Richie Porte with him. He dropped them both with that acceleration, won the stage in solo fashion and put considerable time into all his general classification rivals. Porte was second, followed by Quintana at one minute and four seconds. LottoNL–Jumbo's Robert Gesink, who had attacked shortly after the beginning of the climb, reaped a fourth position. Tejay van Garderen finished tenth at 2' 30", Contador at 2' 51" and Nibali at 4' 25". Contador blamed the performance on respiratory problems. MTN–Qhubeka's Daniel Teklehaimanot relinquished his polka dot jersey to Froome, although it was worn by Porte in the next stage as he is second in the mountains classification.

Stage 10 result

Rank	Rider	Team	Time
1	Chris Froome (GBR)	Team Sky	4h 22' 07"
2	Richie Porte (AUS)	Team Sky	+ 59"
3	Nairo Quintana (COL)	Movistar Team	+ 1' 04"
4	Robert Gesink (NED)	LottoNL–Jumbo	+ 1' 33"
5	Alejandro Valverde (ESP)	Movistar Team	+ 2' 01"
6	Geraint Thomas (GBR)	Team Sky	+ 2' 01"
7	Adam Yates (GBR)	Orica–GreenEDGE	+ 2' 04"
8	Pierre Rolland (FRA)	Team Europcar	+ 2' 04"
9	Tony Gallopin (FRA)	Lotto–Soudal	+ 2' 22"
10	Tejay van Garderen (USA)	BMC Racing Team	+ 2' 30"

General classification after stage 10

Rank	Rider	Team	Time
1	Chris Froome (GBR)	Team Sky	35h 56' 09"
2	Tejay van Garderen (USA)	BMC Racing Team	+ 2' 52"
3	Nairo Quintana (COL)	Movistar Team	+ 3' 09"
4	Alejandro Valverde (ESP)	Movistar Team	+ 4' 01"
5	Geraint Thomas (GBR)	Team Sky	+ 4' 03"
6	Alberto Contador (ESP)	Tinkoff–Saxo	+ 4' 04"
7	Tony Gallopin (FRA)	Lotto–Soudal	+ 4' 33"
8	Robert Gesink (NED)	LottoNL–Jumbo	+ 4' 35"
9	Warren Barguil (FRA)	Team Giant–Alpecin	+ 6' 12"
10	Vincenzo Nibali (ITA)	Astana	+ 6' 57"

== Stage 11 ==
15 July 2015 — Pau to Cauterets – Vallée de Saint-Savin, 188 km (117 mi)

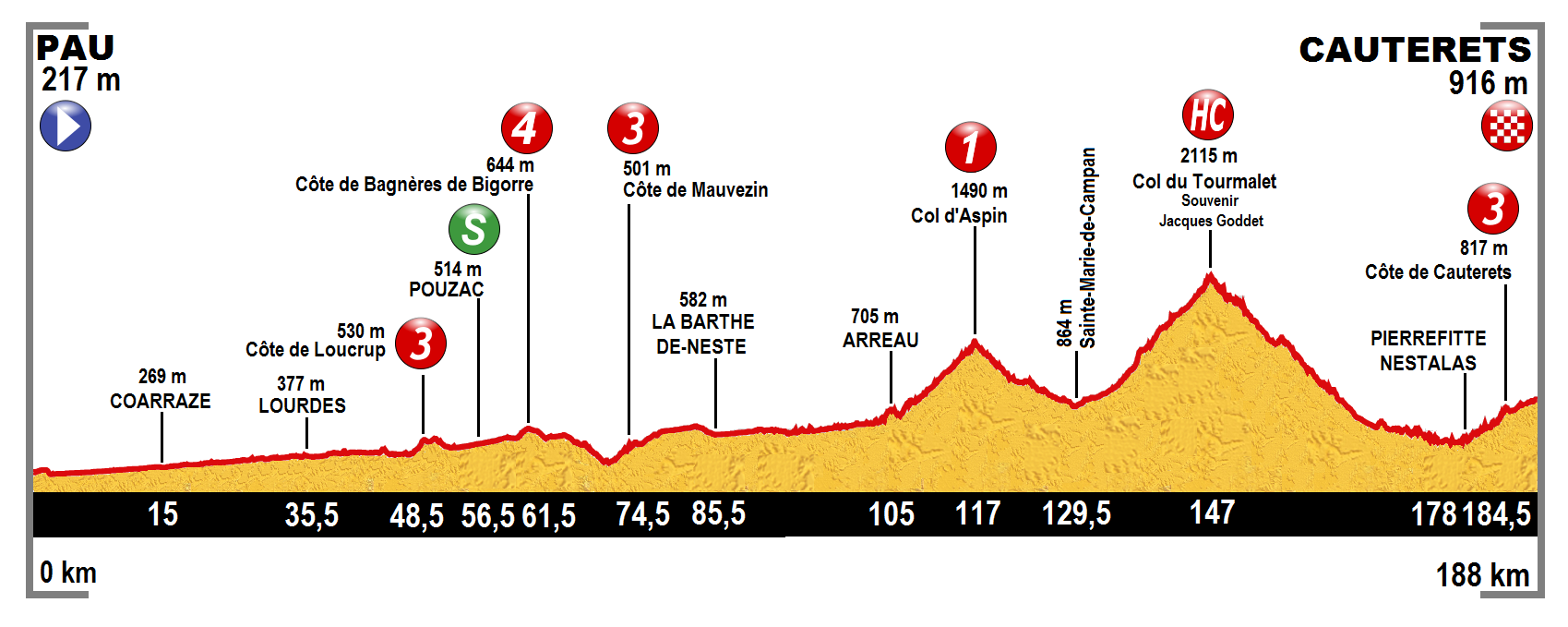
Stage 11 profile

This stage departed from Pau, heading south-east to Saint-Pé-de-Bigorre and then east through Lourdes. The peloton then headed over the category 3 Côte de Loucrup turning south-east before a sprint in Pouzac, riding through Bagnères-de-Bigorre, turning north-east to the category 4 Côte de Bagnères-de-Bigorre and then east to the category 3 Côte de Mauvezin. The race turned south at La Barthe-de-Neste heading to Arreau before facing the 12 km (7.5 mi) climb of the category 1 Col d'Aspin, with a 6.5% gradient ascending to 1,490 m (4,890 ft). The riders then descended into the valley at Sainte-Marie-de-Campan and began the Hors catégorie Col du Tourmalet, a 17.1 km (10.6 mi) climb, at a gradient of 7.3%, to a height of 2,115 metres (6,939 ft), taking the eastern route through La Mongie. The first rider over the summit received the Souvenir Jacques Goddet. The race then descended through Luz-Saint-Sauveur to Pierrefitte-Nestalas to begin the category 3 Côte de Cauterets, a 6.4 km (4.0 mi) climb with a 5% gradient, before finishing in Cauterets itself.

Stage 11 result

Rank	Rider	Team	Time
1	Rafał Majka (POL)	Tinkoff–Saxo	5h 02' 01"
2	Dan Martin (IRL)	Cannondale–Garmin	+ 1' 00"
3	Emanuel Buchmann (GER)	Bora–Argon 18	+ 1' 23"
4	Serge Pauwels (BEL)	MTN–Qhubeka	+ 2' 08"
5	Thomas Voeckler (FRA)	Team Europcar	+ 3' 34"
6	Julien Simon (FRA)	Cofidis	+ 3' 34"
7	Bauke Mollema (NED)	Trek Factory Racing	+ 5' 11"
8	Alejandro Valverde (ESP)	Movistar Team	+ 5' 19"
9	Chris Froome (GBR)	Team Sky	+ 5' 21"
10	Alberto Contador (ESP)	Tinkoff–Saxo	+ 5' 21"

General classification after stage 11

Rank	Rider	Team	Time
1	Chris Froome (GBR)	Team Sky	41h 03' 31"
2	Tejay van Garderen (USA)	BMC Racing Team	+ 2' 52"
3	Nairo Quintana (COL)	Movistar Team	+ 3' 09"
4	Alejandro Valverde (ESP)	Movistar Team	+ 3' 59"
5	Geraint Thomas (GBR)	Team Sky	+ 4' 03"
6	Alberto Contador (ESP)	Tinkoff–Saxo	+ 4' 04"
7	Tony Gallopin (FRA)	Lotto–Soudal	+ 4' 33"
8	Robert Gesink (NED)	LottoNL–Jumbo	+ 4' 35"
9	Warren Barguil (FRA)	Team Giant–Alpecin	+ 6' 44"
10	Bauke Mollema (NED)	Trek Factory Racing	+ 7' 05"
