= Gouy-lez-Piéton =

Village in the province of Hainaut, Wallonia, Belgium

Coordinates: 50.4833°N 4.3167°E

Gouy-lez-Pieton (Walloon: Gowi(-dlé-Pieton)) is a village of Wallonia and a district of the municipality of Courcelles, located in the province of Hainaut, Belgium.

It was a fully fledged municipality before the fusion of the Belgian municipalities of 1977.

== The Church of Saint-Martin ==
The original church, built during the 12th century, disappeared to make way for the current building, classified in 1961. The current and refurbished Church of Saint-Martin of Gouy-lez-Piéton was largely built in the 16th century, with a further transformation in the 18th century. Some of the church's furnishings date back to the 1600s. The surroundings of the place of worship are well maintained, with a small park behind the building. This church is the copy of the Church of Saint-Martin in Trazegnies, a village adjacent to Gouy-lez-piéton.
