= Mauvezin, Hautes-Pyrénées =

Mauvezin
- Commune
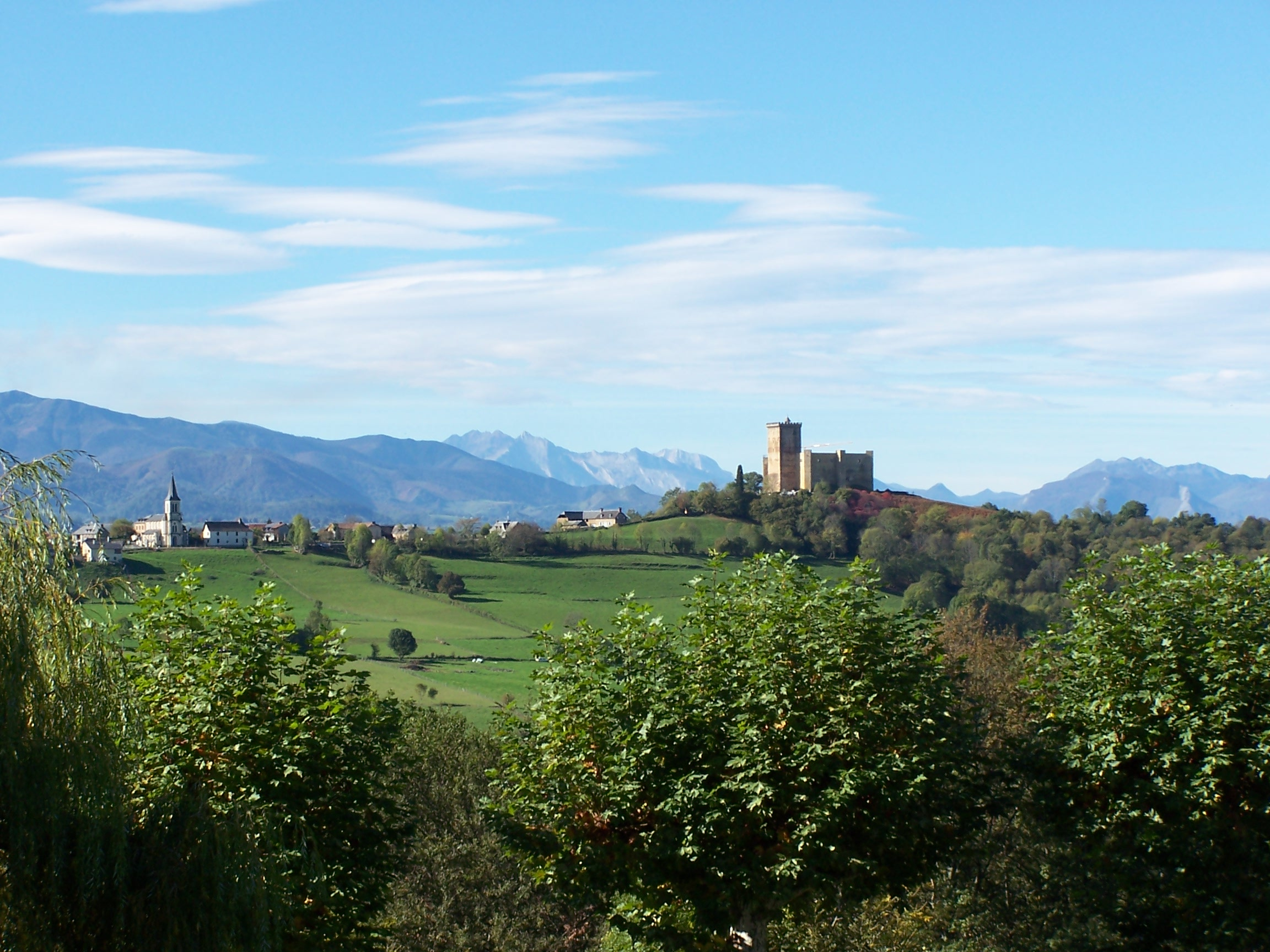
- The village and château

- Coat of arms
- Location of Mauvezin
- Location within France Location within Occitanie
- Coordinates: 43°06′57″N 0°17′02″E
- Country: France
- Region: Occitania
- Department: Hautes-Pyrénées
- Arrondissement: Bagnères-de-Bigorre
- Canton: La Vallée de l'Arros et des Baïses
- Intercommunality: Plateau de Lannemezan

Government
  - Mayor (2022–2026): Patrick Abadie
- Area^{1}: 10 km^{2} (3.9 sq mi)
- Highest elevation: 574 m (1,883 ft)
- Lowest elevation: 297 m (974 ft)
- Population (2023): 243
  - Density: 24/km^{2} (63/sq mi)
- Time zone: UTC+01:00 (CET)
  - Summer (DST): UTC+02:00 (CEST)
- INSEE/Postal code: 65306 /65130
- ^{1} French Land Register data, which excludes lakes, ponds, glaciers > 1 km^{2} (0.386 sq mi or 247 acres) and river estuaries.

Mauvezin (French pronunciation: [mov(ə)zɛ̃]; Gascon: Mauvesin) is a commune in the Hautes-Pyrénées department in south-western France.

== See also ==
- Communes of the Hautes-Pyrénées department
