= Saint-Python =

- Commune
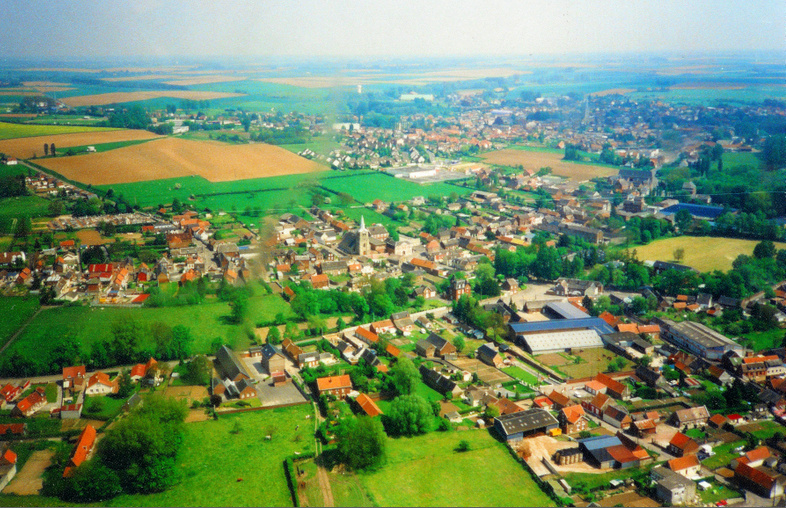
- Aerial shot of Saint-Python in 1984.

- Coat of arms
- Location of Saint-Python
- Location within France Location within Hauts-de-France
- Coordinates: 50°11′26″N 3°28′57″E
- Country: France
- Region: Hauts-de-France
- Department: Nord
- Arrondissement: Cambrai
- Canton: Caudry
- Intercommunality: CC Pays Solesmois

Government
  - Mayor (2020–2026): Georges Flamengt
- Area^{1}: 7.43 km^{2} (2.87 sq mi)
- Elevation: 85 m (279 ft)
- Highest elevation: 117 m (384 ft)
- Lowest elevation: 58 m (190 ft)
- Population (2023): 978
  - Density: 132/km^{2} (341/sq mi)
- Time zone: UTC+01:00 (CET)
  - Summer (DST): UTC+02:00 (CEST)
- INSEE/Postal code: 59541 /59730
- ^{1} French Land Register data, which excludes lakes, ponds, glaciers > 1 km^{2} (0.386 sq mi or 247 acres) and river estuaries.

Saint-Python (French pronunciation: [sɛ̃ pitɔ̃]; officially spelt Sainct-Pieton and St-Piton during different periods preceding 1800) is a commune in the Nord department in northern France. It was named after Piatus of Tournai. Its inhabitants are called Saint-Piatiens or Piatonnais.

== Toponymy ==
- In 1176, a Leprosarium Title of Cambrai first mentions 'Santus Piatus'.
- 'Sancto Piato' is found in a letter by Roger de Wavrin, évêque de Cambrai in 1182 and in the Communal Charter of Solesmes in 1202.
- 'Python' is a deformation of 'Piatus or Piat'. The church of the commune is also under the name of Saint-Piat also named Piat de Seclin or Piatus of Tournai, thus confirming the origin of the name of the village.

== Heraldry ==
Arms of Saint-Python	The arms of Saint-Python are blazoned : Ermine, 3 lozenges gules.

== History ==
=== Chronology ===
The following chronologically-ordered dates mark the historical events which had the most impact on Saint-Python:

- 57 BC: The legions of Julius Caesar marched on the Mourmont, a lieu-dit between Saint-Python and Solesmes to lead the Battle of the Sabis, and were nearly defeated.
- 1074: Saint Lietbertus donated lands and properties located in Saint-Python to the Abbaye Saint-André du Cateau in Le Cateau-Cambrésis.
- 1185: Saint-Python was set on fire by Philip I, Count of Flanders.
- April 1263: Founding of a chapel belonging to Abbaye Saint-André.
- 24 February 1416: The Burgundians are housed in Saint-Python.
- 1437–1440: The écorcheurs (French: [ekɔʁʃœʁ], lit. "flayers") devastated the country including Saint-Python.
- 1450: The plague struck Saint-Python at least in 1450 and around 1669 (as quoted in Solesmes' Public Registers).
- 1536: Reconstruction of Saint-Python Church.
- 1544–1581: The village is periodically abandoned during French occupation of the region, with some inhabitants taking refuge in Cambrai, Valenciennes or Le Quesnoy.
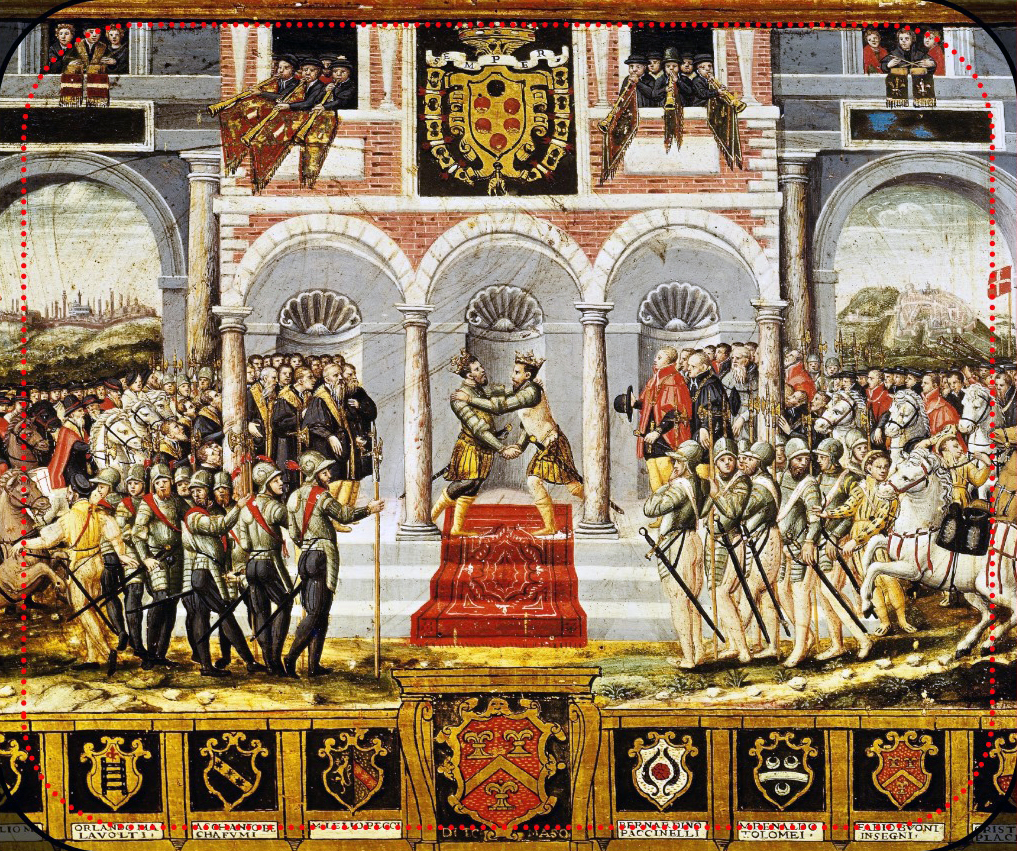
- Traités du Cateau-Cambrésis (1559) involving St-Python.
  1559: Traités du Cateau-Cambrésis: Peace between Henry II of France and Philip II of Spain.
- 7 July 1637: Landrecies and Le Cateau taken by the French (Turenne). Saint-Python is declared to have been abandoned after taking Landrecies.

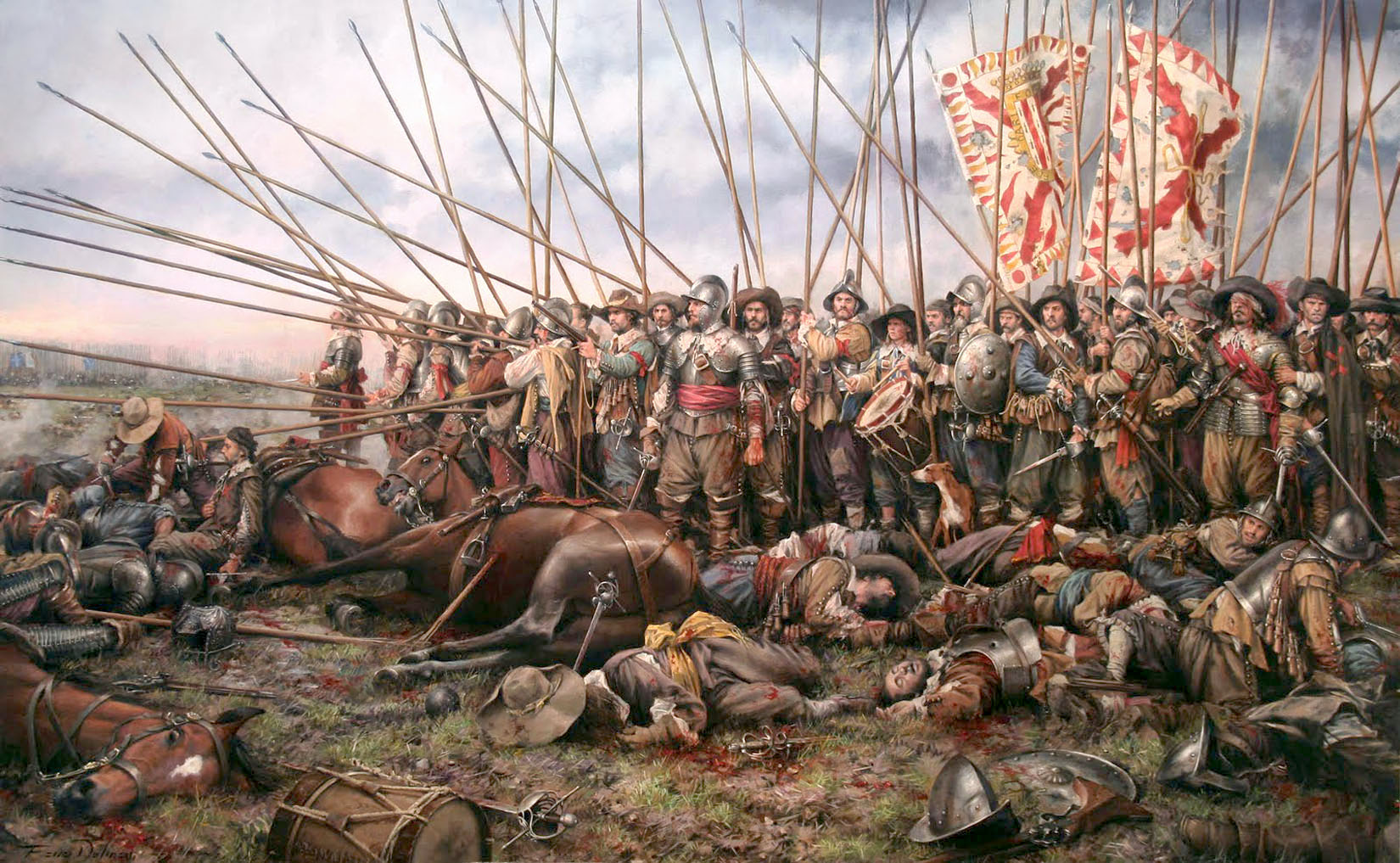
Battle of Rocroi (1643) by Augusto Ferrer-Dalmau.

- 7 November 1659: The Treaty of the Pyrenees was signed to end the 1635–1659 Franco-Spanish war. Saint-Python then becomes French.
- 2 May 1668: Treaty of Aix-la-Chapelle: France takes over Douai, Saint-Amand-les-Eaux, Lille.
- March 1675: Saint-Python is obliged to deliver to many cities many carts full of fodder for the king such as in Le Quesnoy, Avesnes-les-Aubert, Fayt, Charleroi, Ors, Philippeville).
- On 10 August 1678: Treaties of Peace of Nijmegen (Traités de Paix de Nimègue)that gives France Valenciennes, Bouchain, Cambrai, Bavay and Maubeuge.
- 1757: Construction of the current Saint-Python's Church.
- 1790: Saint-Python's first municipal election. The first mayor is Charles J. Marlier.
- 1793: Several conflicts occur when Catholic clerics refuse to follow the Decadary Cult.
- 1832, 1848 and 1866: Cholera raged in Saint-Python.
- 9 May 1944: Saint-Python hit by Allied bombing.

== Government ==
Until 1790 many different lords owned Saint-Python's lands and properties and had administrative power over the town. Notable lords included Claude Lamoral De Ligne, a nobleman, soldier, and diplomat from the Spanish Netherlands in the service of Philip IV of Spain and Charles II of Spain, who controlled Saint-Python from 1641 to 1679.

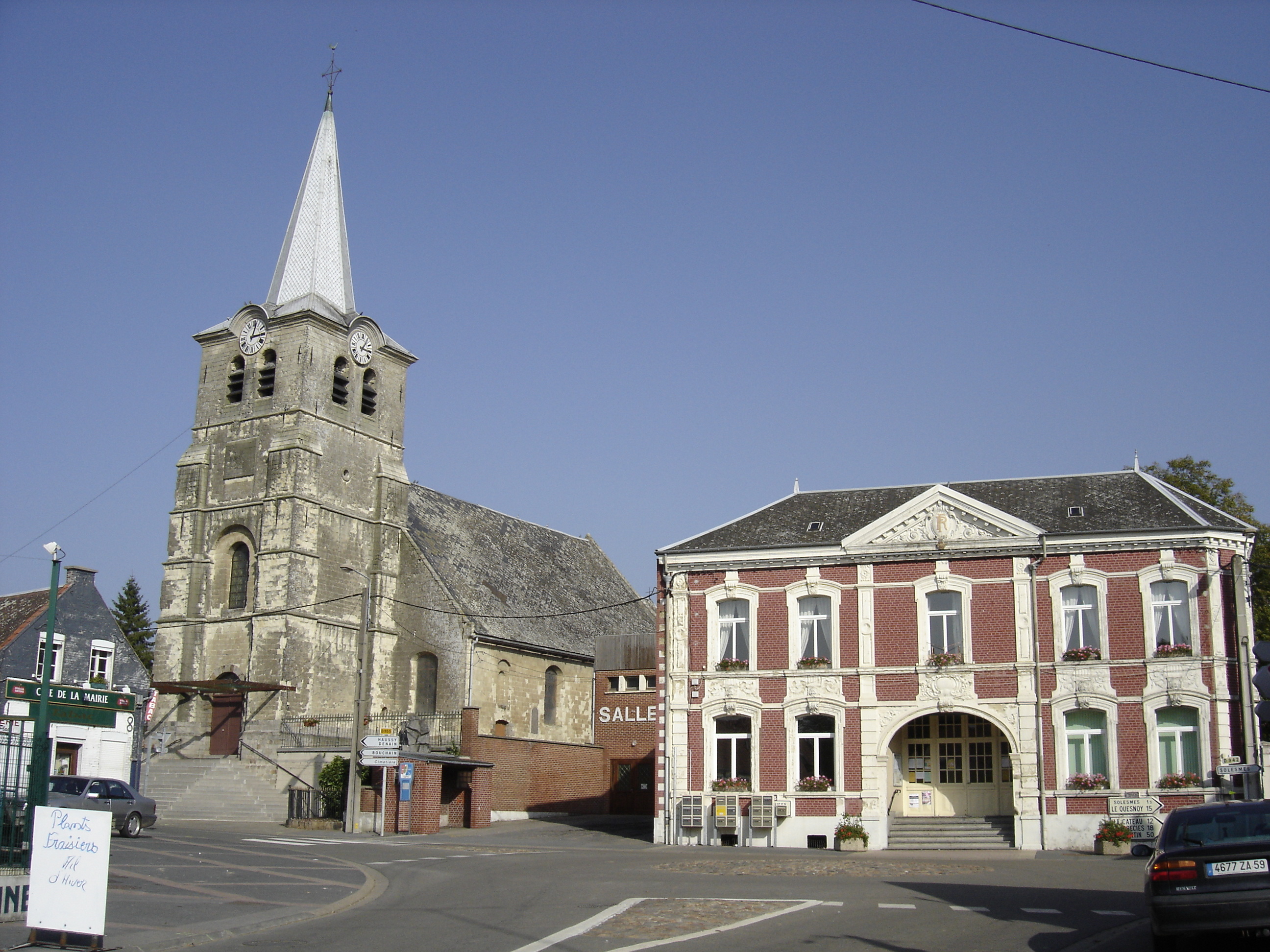
Saint-Python's Church and Townhall.

On 3 February 1790, voters elected Mr. Duplessy, vicar of St-Python, as public prosecutor, but he refused. On 23 February Etienne Dambrinne was elected prosecutor but already held another office, so the function was given to Mr. Lernou, priest of St-Python. This first municipal act was recorded on a sheet of paper from St-Python's Marlier paper mill, decorated with a drawing of three fleurs-de-lis inside a circle.

Georges Flamengt has been mayor of Saint-Python since election in March 2001.

In the 2017 French presidential election, Marine Le Pen came in first place in the 2nd (final) round with 59.41% of the votes in Saint-Python, ahead of Emmanuel Macron (En Marche!) who received 40.59% of the votes. 7.21% of voters returned a blank ballot paper. The participation rate was 77.73% for the 2nd round, a decline in turnout of 1.68 points from the first round of the election.

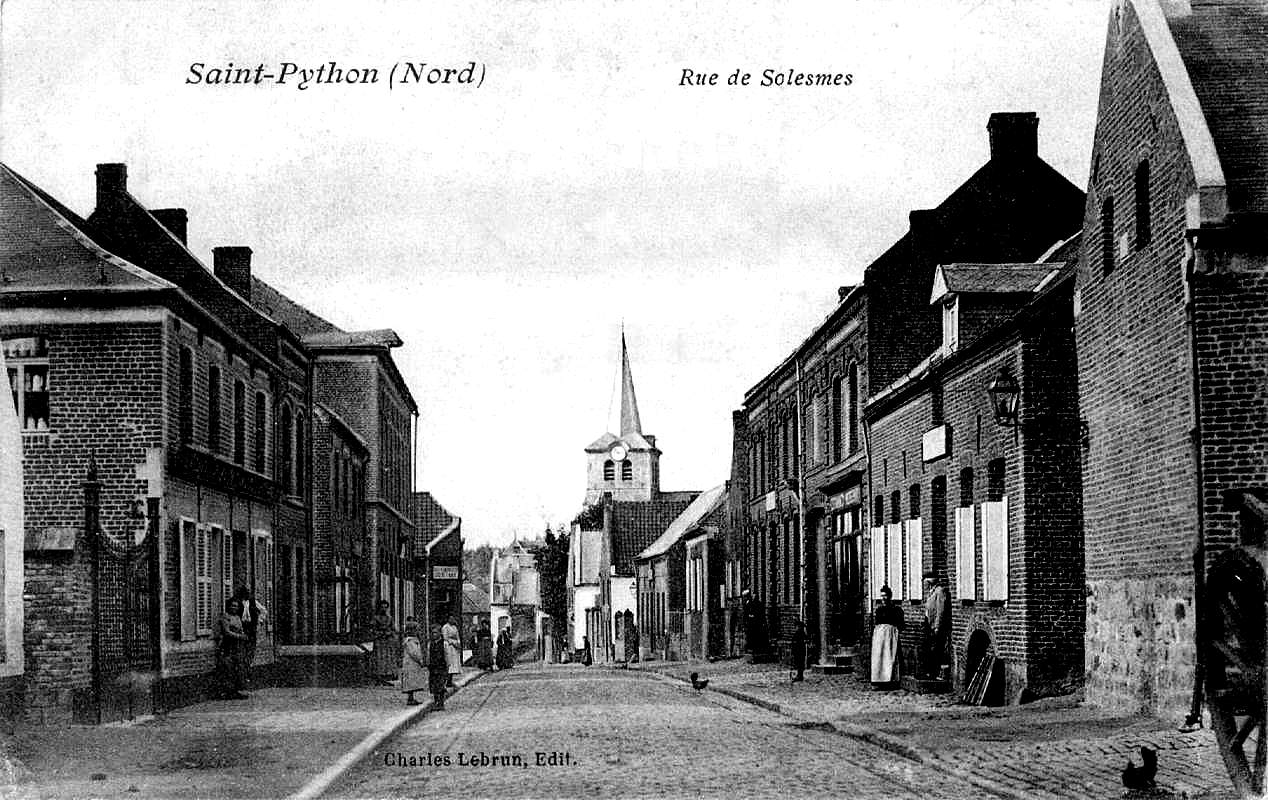
Saint-Python: Rue de Solesmes (1905)

== Geography ==
The town of Saint-Python is located in the department of Nord part of the Hauts-de-France region. It belongs to the arrondissement of Cambrai (19 km) and the canton of Caudry (11 km). The town is a member of the 'Communauté de communes du Pays Solesmois', which brings together 15 municipalities (Beaurain, Bermerain, Capelle, Escarmain, Haussy, Montrécourt, Romeries, Saint-Martin-sur-Écaillon, Saint-Python, Saulzoir, Solesmes, Sommaing, Vendegies-sur-Écaillon, Vertain and Viesly) for a total population of just under 15,000.

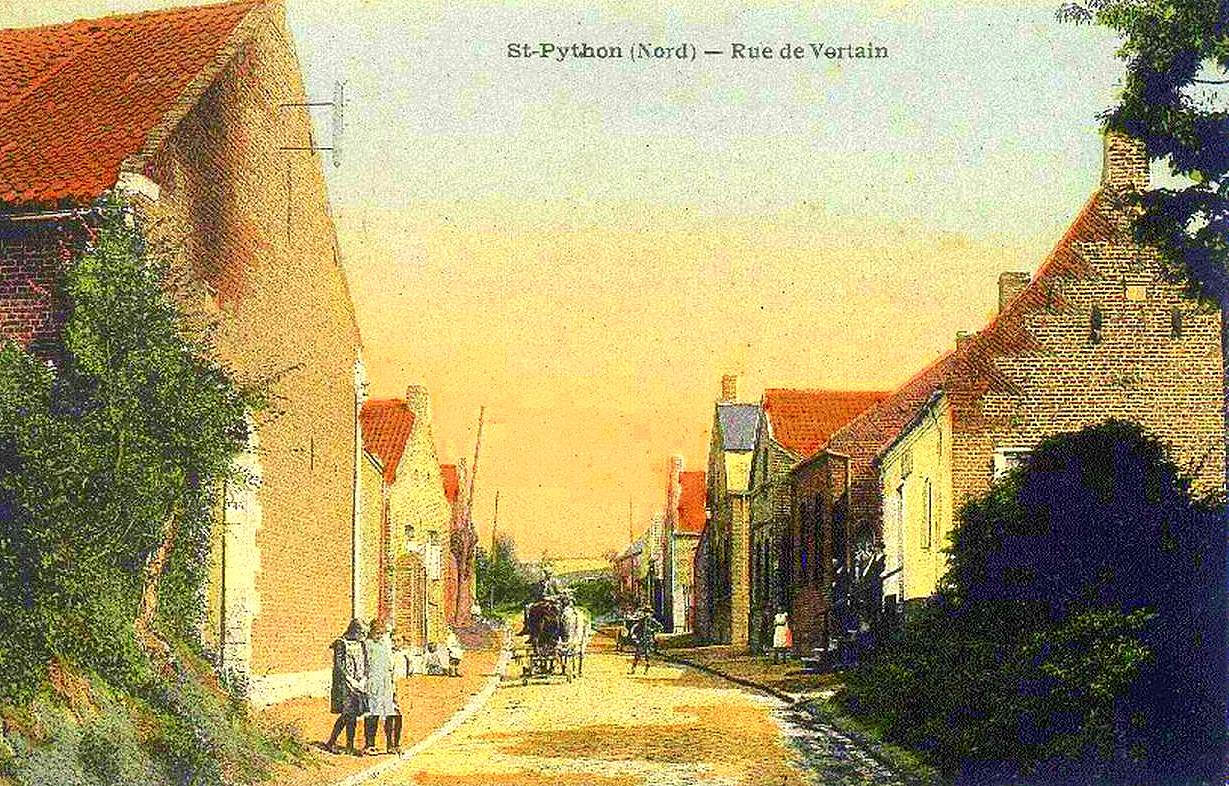
Saint-Python Rue de Vertain (1910)

== Population and society ==
In 2023, the commune had 978 inhabitants, a decrease of 31% compared to 1968. In January 2019, mayor Georges Flamengt announced two major social projects: a renovation of Haussy Street and the rehabilitation of a former company building into social housing units.

== Education ==
The town has one public primary school: the École maternelle et élémentaire de Saint-Python. It is contractually regulated by the Academy of Lille. Secondary schools include the public Collège Antoine de Saint-Exupéry and the private Catholic Institution Saint-Michel, both located in Solesmes.

== Places and monuments ==
One of the paths of Camino de Santiago the via septentriones templi passes through the village coming from Haussy. It goes through the municipal park, then the church, before leaving by meandering in the streets towards Saint-Vaast-en Cambrésis by hiking trails. Several tags are in fact embedded in the tar, plus two labels on the way.

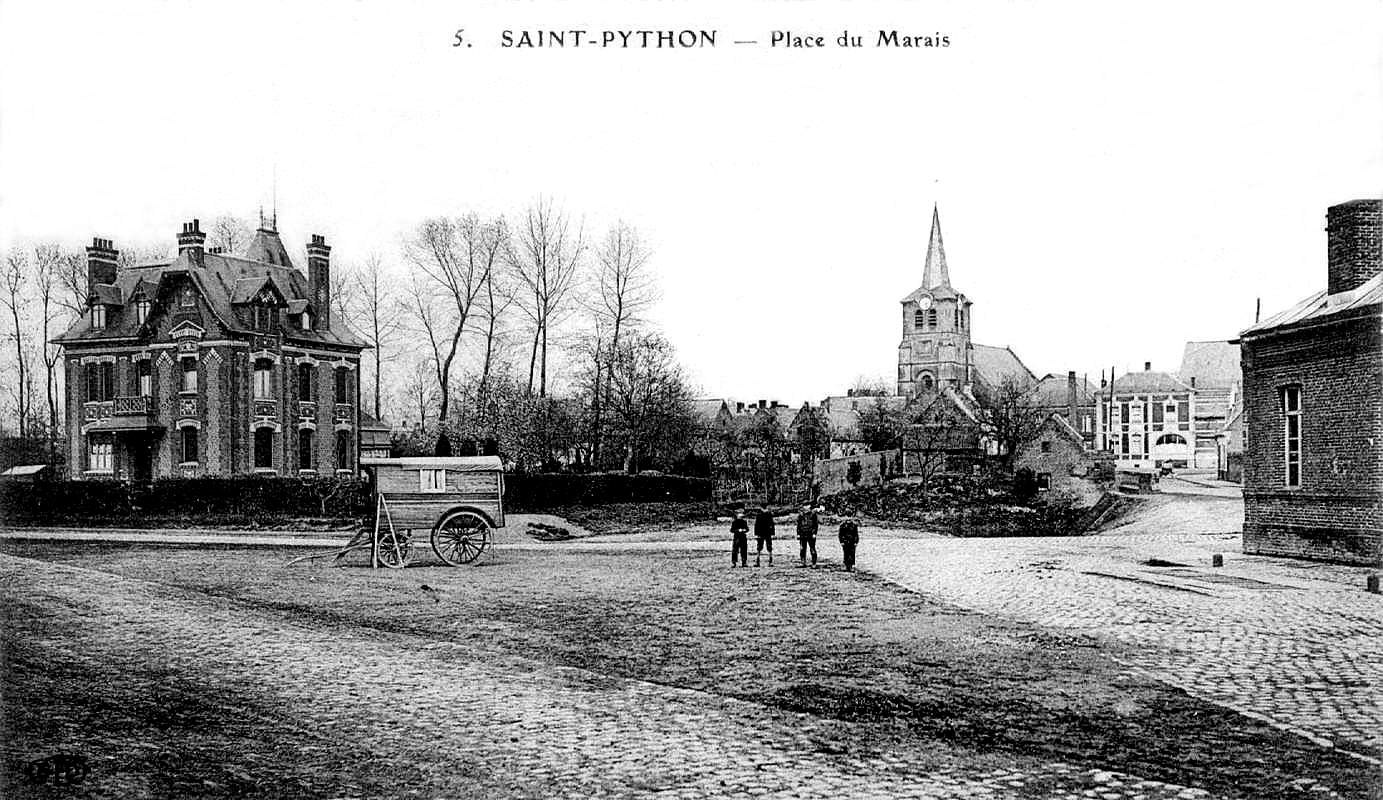
The smaller Leterme Castle (1908).

Saint-Python has two castles: the Cardon Castle, referred to as "Saint-Python's Castle", and the smaller Leterme Castle. In 1185, Saint-Python's Castle was set on fire by Philip I, Count of Flanders. On 28 September 2007 the castle, which now belongs to the Pavot family, endured another fire devastating the floors and roofs. It was once again restored the following year.

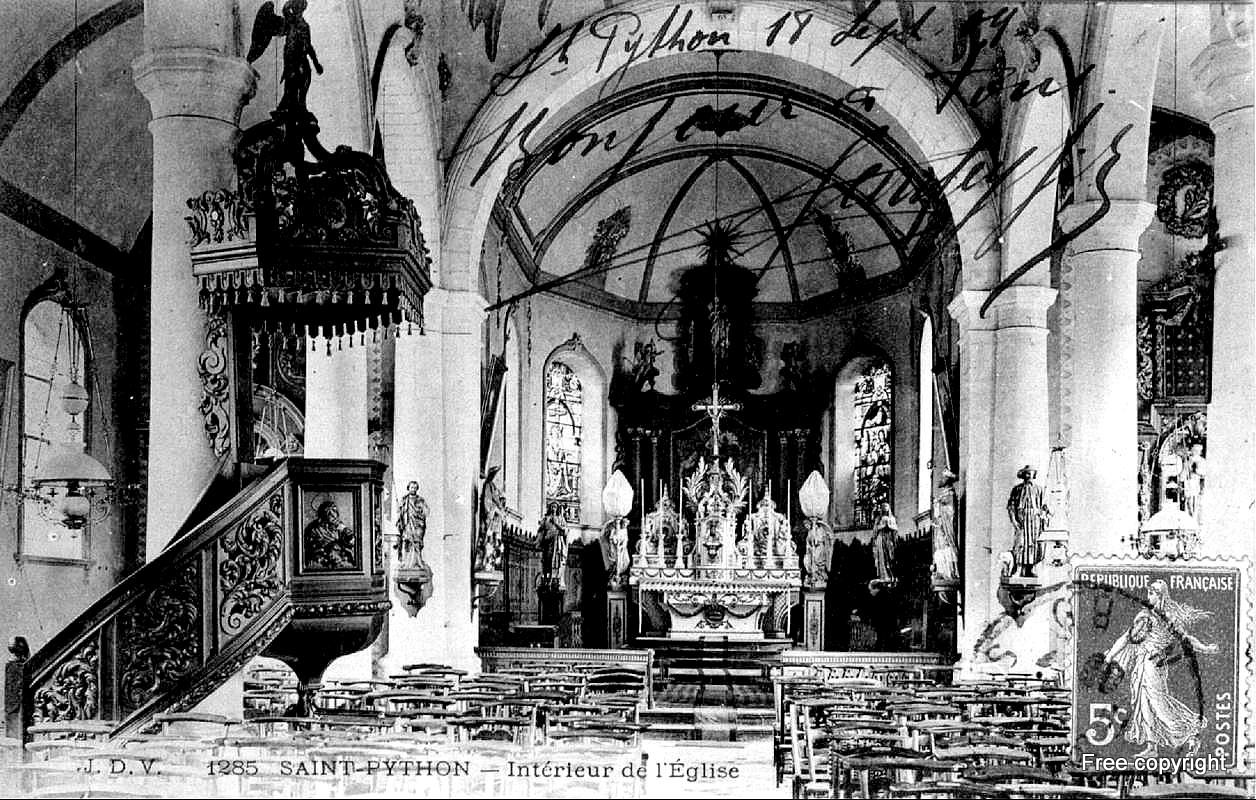
Saint-Python's Church indoors (1905).

== Culture ==
Saint-Python's "Culs de Caudron" celebrations taking place in September and involving the Géants du Nord has been inscribed by UNESCO on the lists of Intangible Cultural Heritage in 2008, originally proclaimed in November 2005 as it is included in the set of folkloric manifestations representing the processional giants and dragons (French: Géants et dragons processionnels) of Belgium and France. Those gigantic figures, incarnating fictitious or real beings, are inherited from medieval rites and are carried or rolled around to dance in the streets during processions or festivals. The "Culs de Caudron" often coincide with a ducasse.

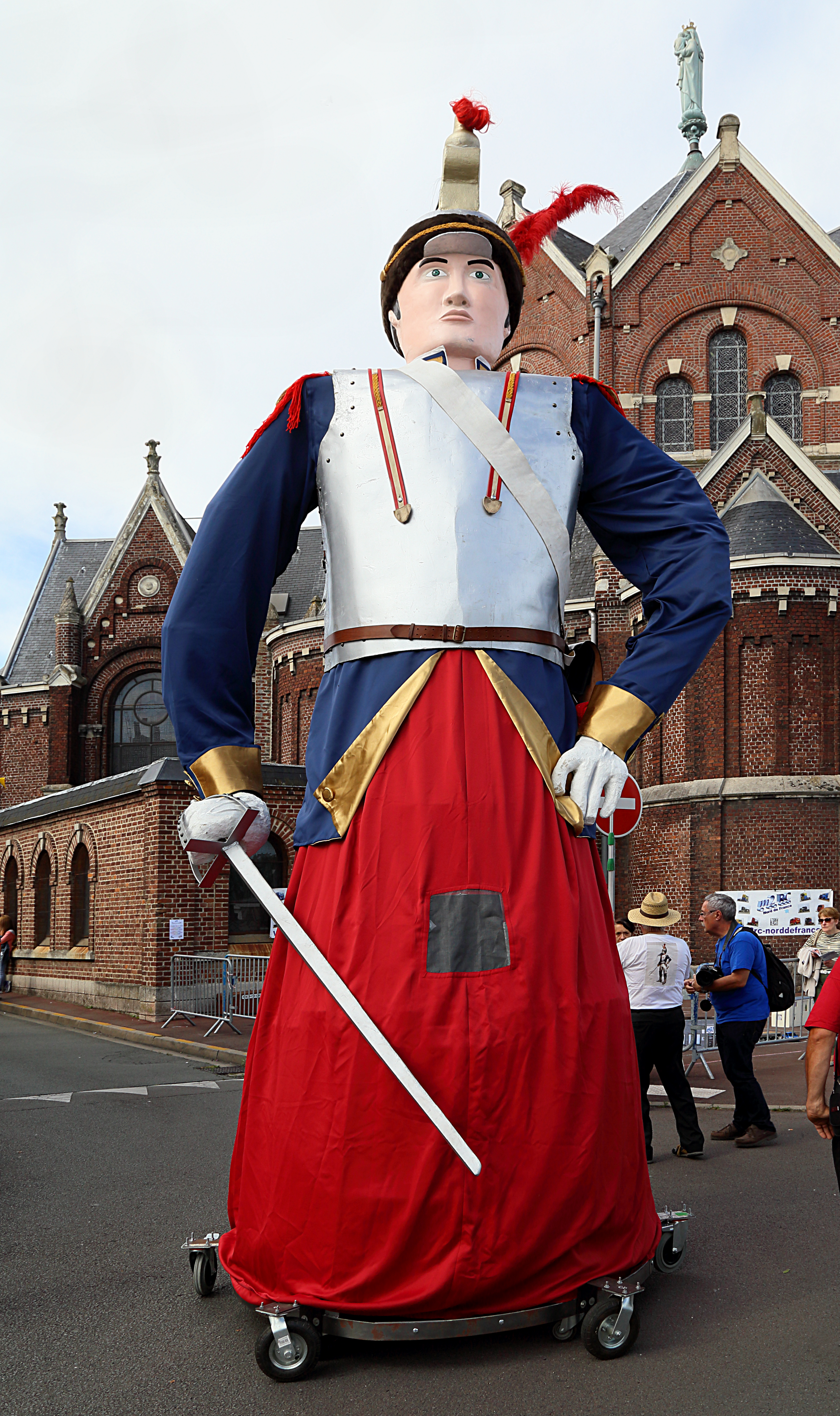

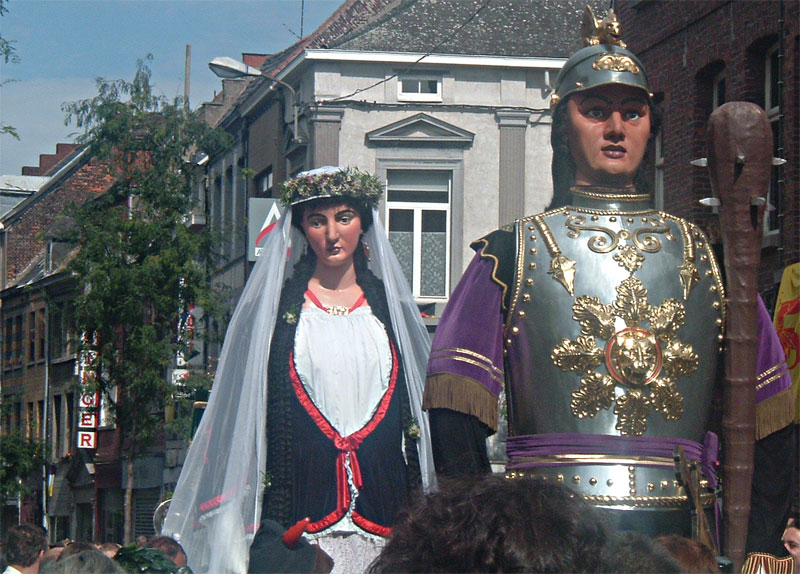

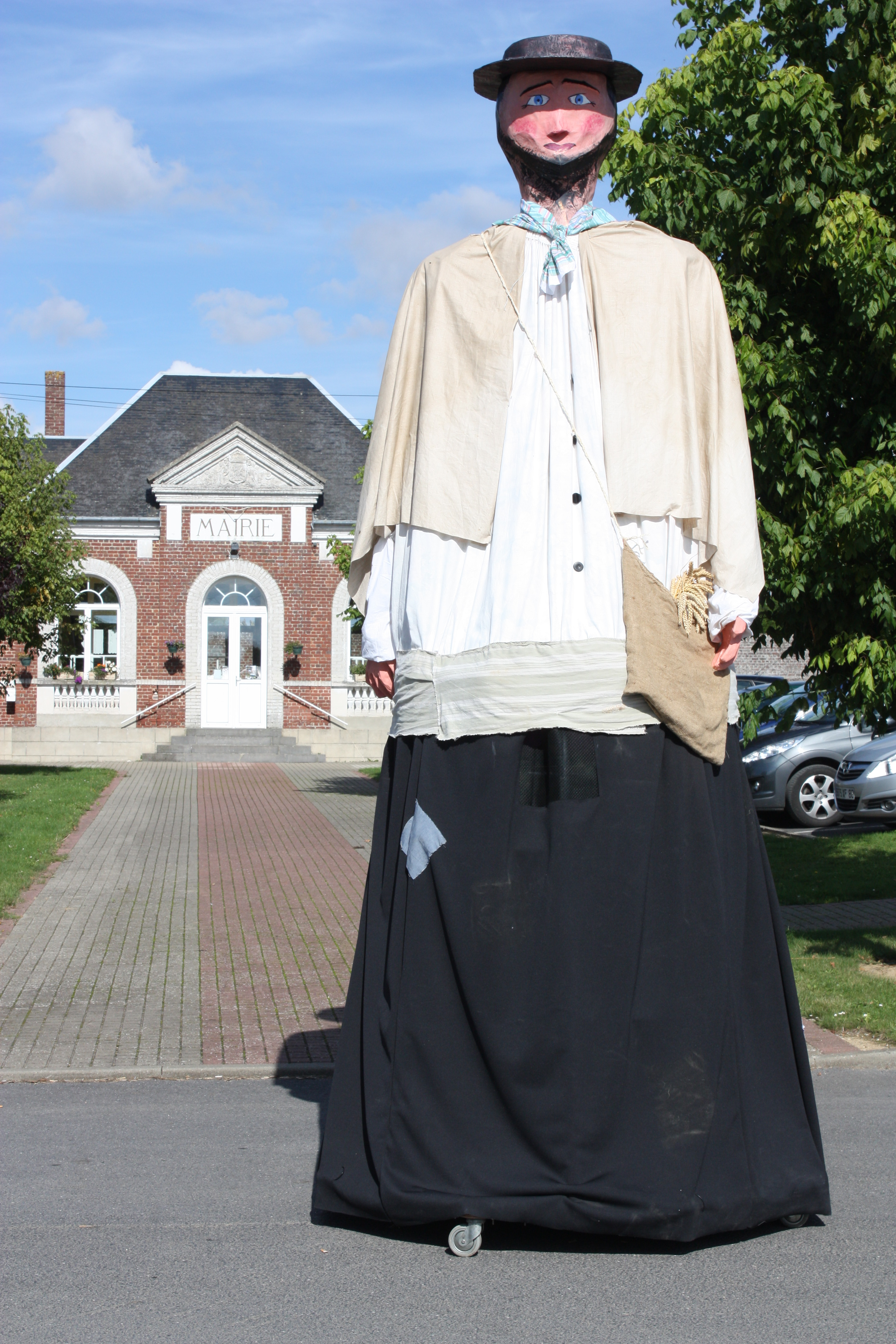

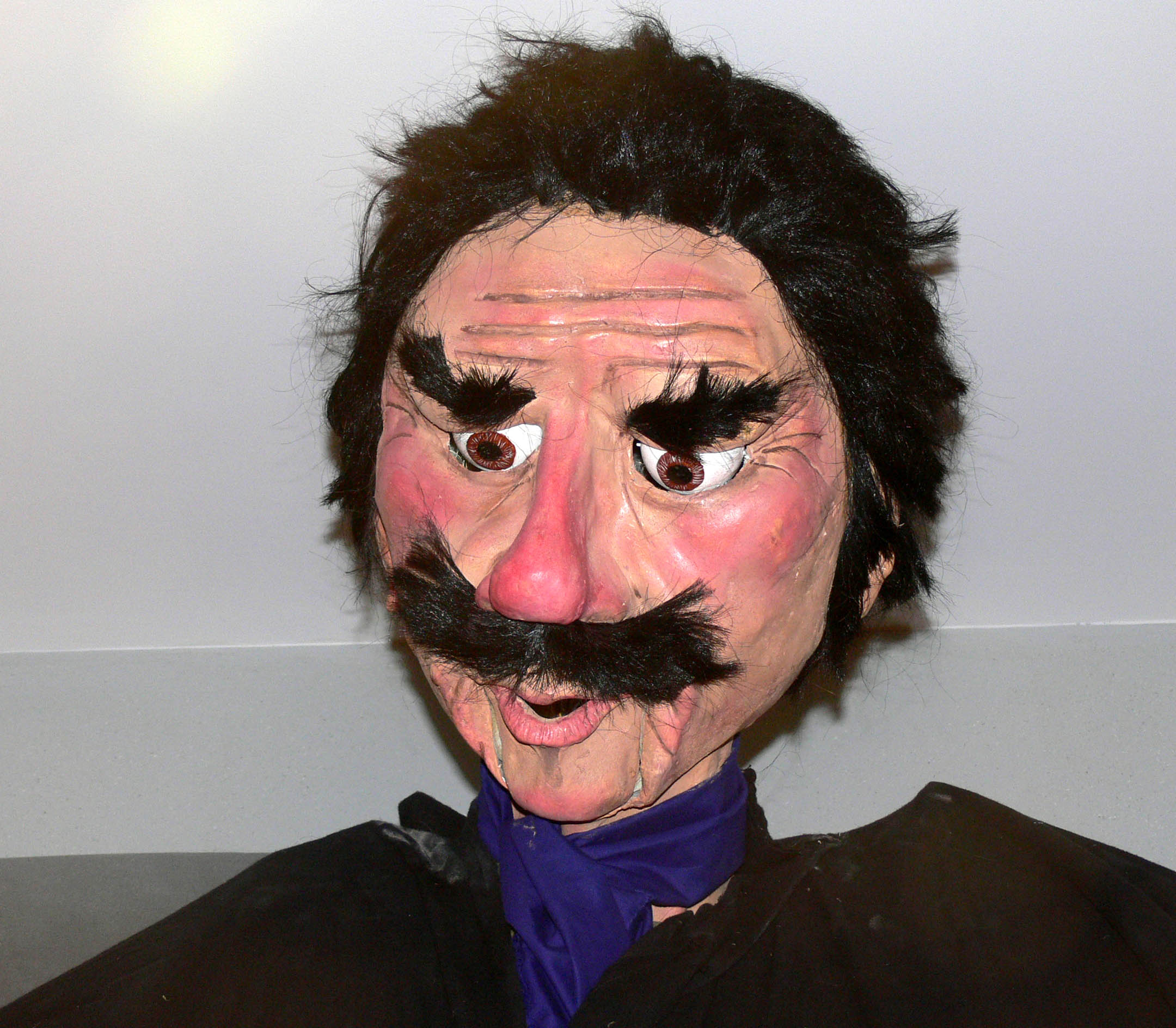

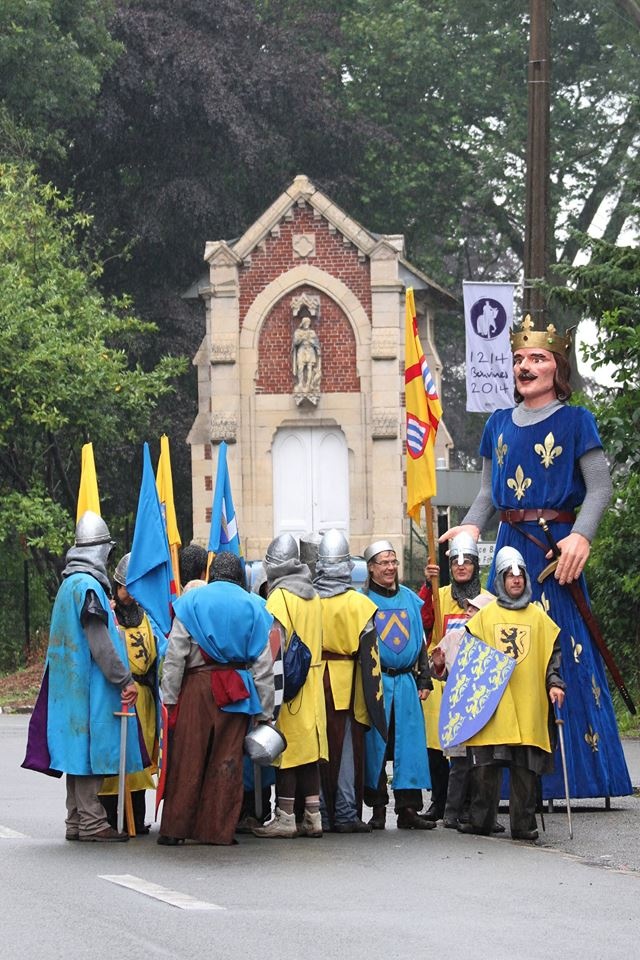

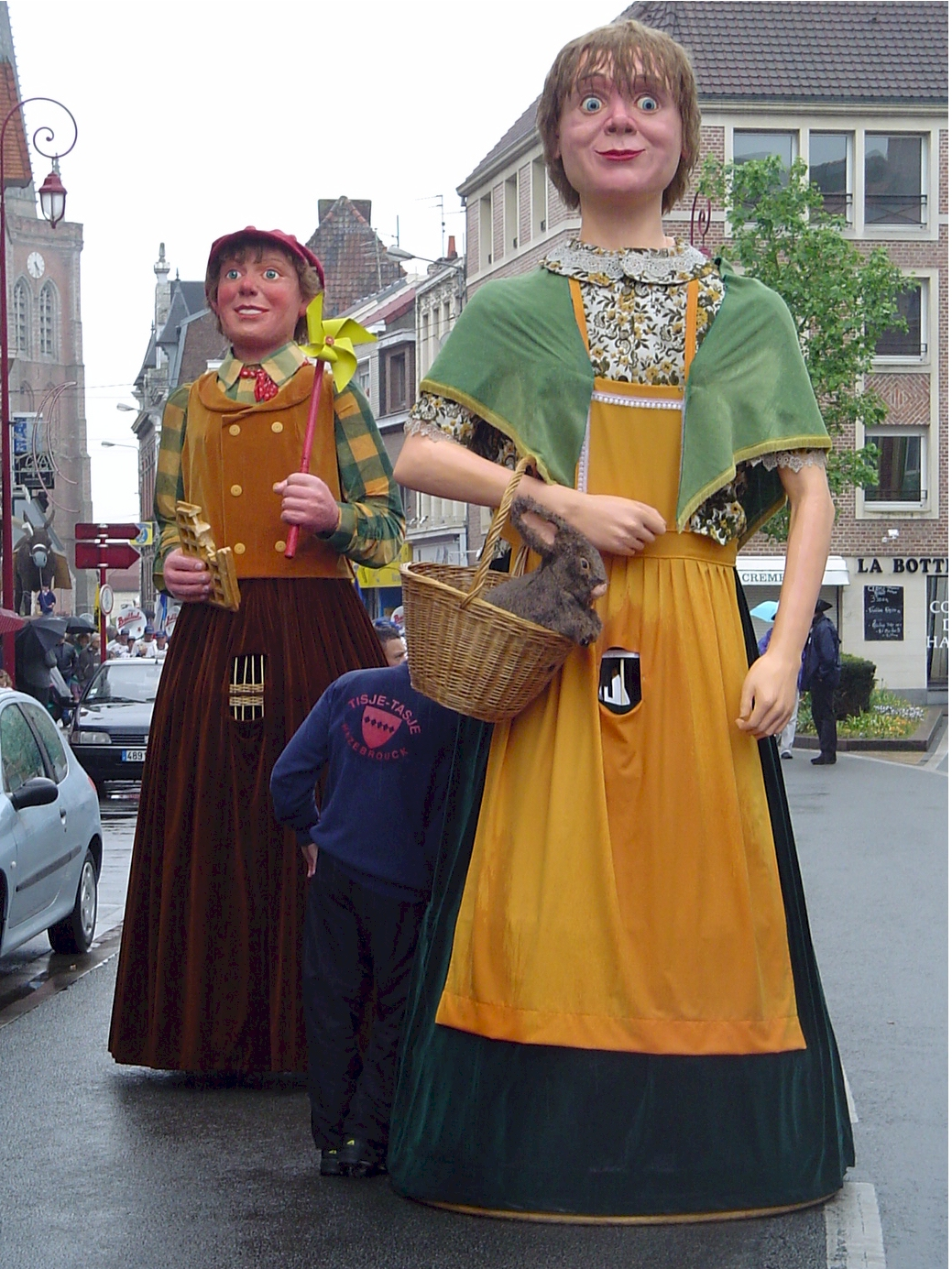

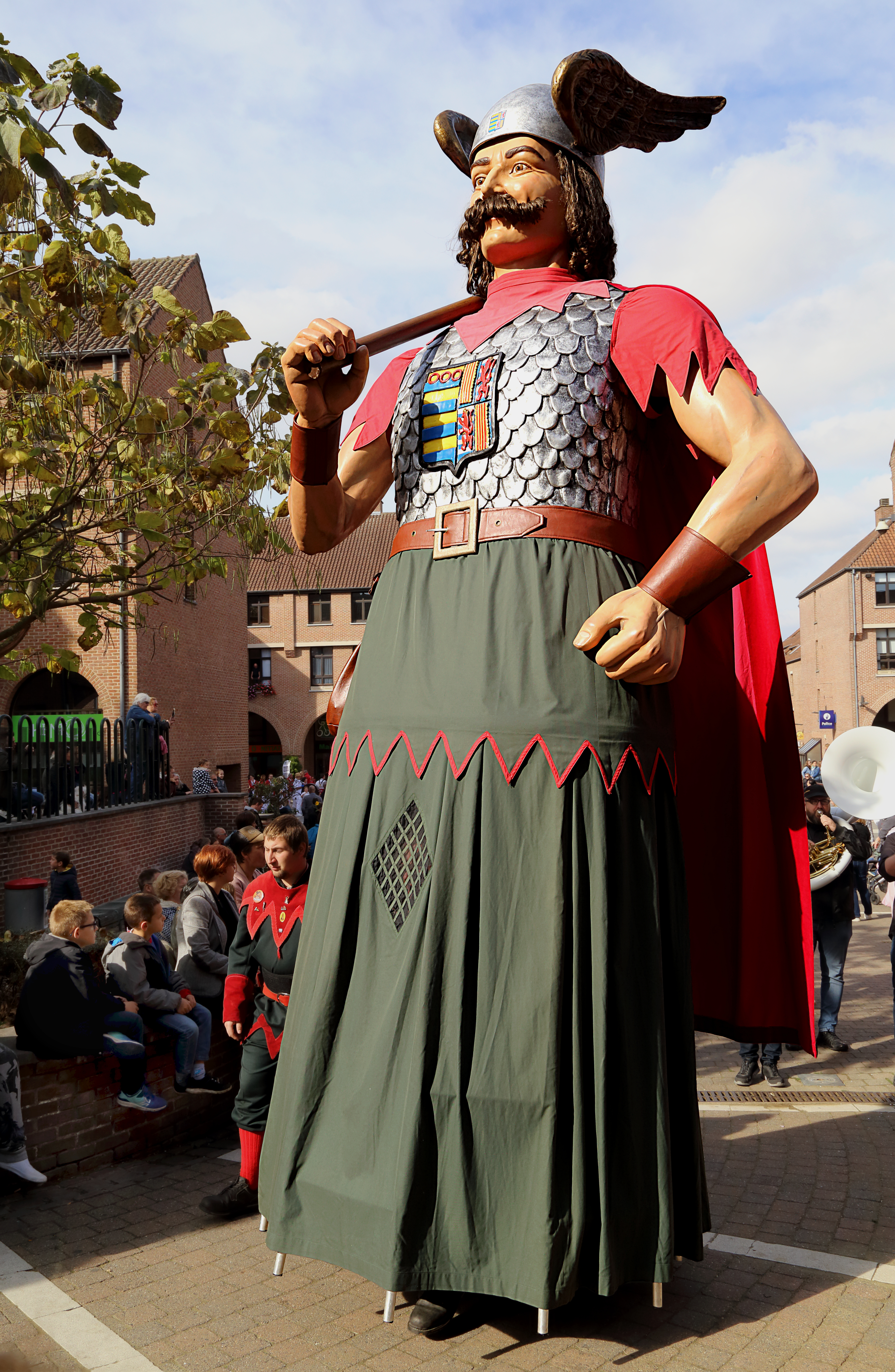

== Notable people from the commune ==
- Raymond Poirette (1928–1944): He was born on 16 March 1928 in Solesmes and died on 2 September 1944 in Saint-Python. He was a French Resistant and was arrested and shot dead at close range at 16 years old while he was handing out leaflets near ‘N° 61 of the Rue d'Haussy'. Solesmes' resistance network was headed by Victor Poirette, Raymond's older brother, and Georges Mailloux. Teenagers then served as liaison agents: Raymond Poirette is among them. Their role was to transport documents, weapons, to transmit orders from one point to another. In addition to his role as liaison officer, Raymond participated in some sabotage operations with the aim of hindering the German retreat. As a tribute to the young resistance fighter, several places bear his name, a street in Solesmes and a school restaurant in Saint-Python.

== Bibliography ==
- Louis Boniface, Etude sur la signification des noms topographiques de l'arrondissement de Cambrai, Valenciennes, Impr. Louis Henry, 1866.

== See also ==
- Communes of the Nord department
