= 2015 Paris–Roubaix =

Cycling race

2015 UCI World Tour, race 10 of 28
- Official event poster

Race details
- Dates: 12 April 2015
- Distance: 253.5 km (157.5 mi)
- Winning time: 5h 49' 51"

Results
	Winner	John Degenkolb (GER)	(Team Giant–Alpecin)
	Second	Zdeněk Štybar (CZE)	(Etixx–Quick-Step)
	Third	Greg Van Avermaet (BEL)	(BMC Racing Team)

The 2015 Paris–Roubaix was the 113th edition of the Paris–Roubaix one-day race. It took place on 12 April and was the tenth race of the 2015 UCI World Tour. It was won by John Degenkolb in a sprint ahead of Zdeněk Štybar and Greg Van Avermaet. Degenkolb became only the second German to win the race, after Josef Fischer's victory at the first edition 119 years earlier.

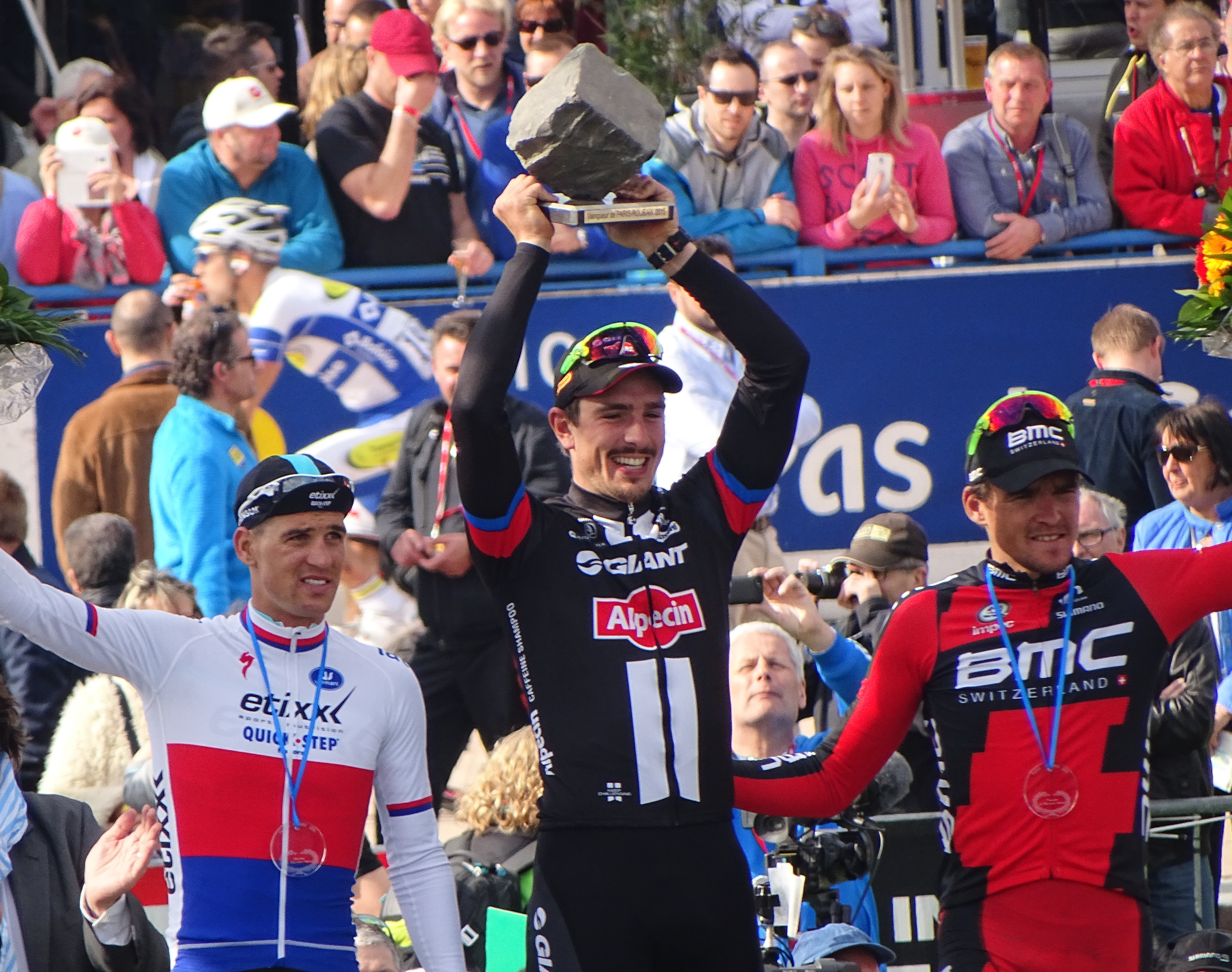
Post-race podium

== Route ==
The 2015 Paris–Roubaix was 253.5 kilometres (157.5 miles) in length, slightly shorter than the previous editions. Despite the name suggesting that the race started in the French capital, it actually started in Compiègne, 80 kilometres (50 miles) north of Paris. After a short, neutralised section, the race began in Clairoix. The first 100 kilometres (62 miles) or so were virtually flat and quiet, before the riders hit the 27 cobbled sections that totalled 52.7 kilometres (32.7 miles), the hardest being the Trouée d'Arenberg, Mons-en-Pévèle and the Carrefour de l'Arbre. Three sections (Quiévy, Saint-Python and Verchain-Maugré) were included in stage 4 of the 2015 Tour de France, held three months later. The last 750 metres (2,460 feet) were held on the Roubaix Velodrome.

== Cobbled sectors ==
Section Number	Name	Kilometre Marker	Length (in m)
27	Troisvilles to Inchy	98.5	2200
26	Viesly to Quiévy	105	1800
25	Quiévy to Saint-Python	108	3700
24	Saint-Python	112.5	1500
23	Vertain to Saint-Martin-sur-Écaillon	120.5	2380
22	Verchain-Maugré to Quérénaing	130	1600
21	Quérénaing to Maing	133.5	2500
20	Maing to Monchaux-sur-Écaillon	136.5	1600
19	Haveluy to Wallers	149.5	2500
18	Trouée d'Arenberg	158	2400
17	Wallers to Hélesmes	164	1600
16	Hornaing to Wandignies-Hamage	170.5	3700
15	Warlaing to Brillon	178	2400
14	Tilloy to Sars-et-Rosières	181.5	2400
13	Beuvry-la-Forêt to Orchies	188	1400
12	Orchies	193	1700
11	Auchy-lez-Orchies to Bersée	199	2700
10	Mons-en-Pévèle	204.5	3000
9	Mérignies to Avelin	210.5	700
8	Pont-Thibaut to Ennevelin	214	1400
7	Templeuve - Moulin-de-Vertain	220	500
6	Cysoing to Bourghelles	226.5	1300
6	Bourghelles to Wannehain	229	1100
5	Camphin-en-Pévèle	233.5	1800
4	Carrefour de l'Arbre	236.5	2100
3	Gruson	238.5	1100
2	Willems to Hem	245.5	1400
1	Roubaix (Espace Crupelandt)	252	300
Total cobbled sections			52700

== Teams ==
As Paris-Roubaix was a UCI World Tour event, all 17 UCI WorldTeams were invited automatically and were obliged to send a squad. Eight Professional Continental teams received wildcard invitations and thus completed the 25-team peloton.

UCI WorldTeams

- AG2R La Mondiale
- Astana
- BMC Racing Team
- Etixx–Quick-Step
- FDJ
- IAM Cycling
- Lampre–Merida
- Lotto–Soudal
- Movistar Team
- Orica–GreenEDGE
- Cannondale–Garmin
- Team Giant–Alpecin
- Team Katusha
- LottoNL–Jumbo
- Team Sky
- Tinkoff–Saxo
- Trek Factory Racing

UCI Professional Continental teams

- Bora–Argon 18
- Bretagne–Séché Environnement
- Cofidis
- MTN–Qhubeka
- Team Europcar
- Topsport Vlaanderen–Baloise
- UnitedHealthcare
- Wanty–Groupe Gobert

== Pre-race favourites ==
Two former multiple winners of the event missed the race due to injury. Four time winner Tom Boonen was ruled out after dislocating his shoulder in a crash during Paris–Nice in March, whilst three-time winner Fabian Cancellara missed out after fracturing two vertebrae in his lower back in a crash at E3 Harelbeke.

Alexander Kristoff (Team Katusha) was tipped by as the favourite to win the race, having won three stages and the general classification of the Three Days of De Panne, the Tour of Flanders and Scheldeprijs in the fortnight leading up to the race. Defending champion Niki Terpstra also showed good form, having been runner up to Kristoff in the Tour of Flanders and also placing second in Gent–Wevelgem a week earlier. He was likely to share leadership of Etixx–Quick-Step with Zdeněk Štybar, who was also in good form with a victory at Strade Bianche and second place at E3 Harelbeke earlier in the classics campaign.

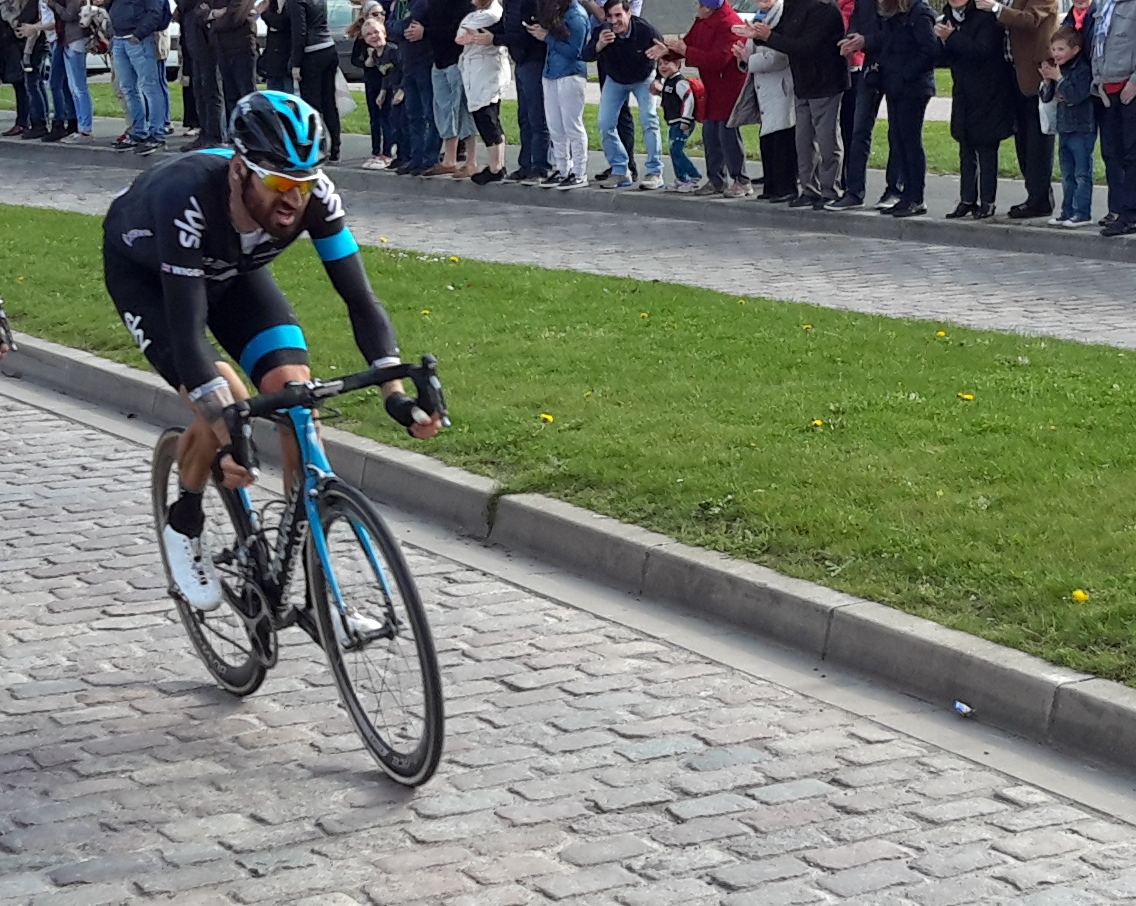
Bradley Wiggins contested his final race for Team Sky, before moving to his eponymous WIGGINS team.

Former Tour de France winner Bradley Wiggins was riding the event as his final race for Team Sky before moving to his new WIGGINS squad to begin his preparations for a return to track racing at the 2016 Summer Olympics. He was expected to share leadership of Sky with Geraint Thomas, winner of E3 Harelbeke, and Ian Stannard, winner of Omloop Het Nieuwsblad. Other likely contenders for victory included Sep Vanmarcke (LottoNL–Jumbo), the runner up in the 2013 edition of the race, John Degenkolb (Team Giant–Alpecin), the runner up of the 2014 edition, Lars Boom (Astana) who won Stage 5 of the 2014 Tour de France which featured some of the Paris–Roubaix cobble sectors, Greg Van Avermaet (BMC Racing Team) and Peter Sagan (Tinkoff–Saxo).

== Results ==
	Cyclist	Team	Time	UCI World Tour Points
1	John Degenkolb (GER)	Team Giant–Alpecin	5h 49' 51"	100
2	Zdeněk Štybar (CZE)	Etixx–Quick-Step	+ 0"	80
3	Greg Van Avermaet (BEL)	BMC Racing Team	+ 0"	70
4	Lars Boom (NED)	Astana	+ 0"	60
5	Martin Elmiger (SUI)	IAM Cycling	+ 0"	50
6	Jens Keukeleire (BEL)	Orica–GreenEDGE	+ 0"	40
7	Yves Lampaert (BEL)	Etixx–Quick-Step	+ 7"	30
8	Luke Rowe (GBR)	Team Sky	+ 28"	20
9	Jens Debusschere (BEL)	Lotto–Soudal	+ 29"	10
10	Alexander Kristoff (NOR)	Team Katusha	+ 31"	4

== Controversy ==
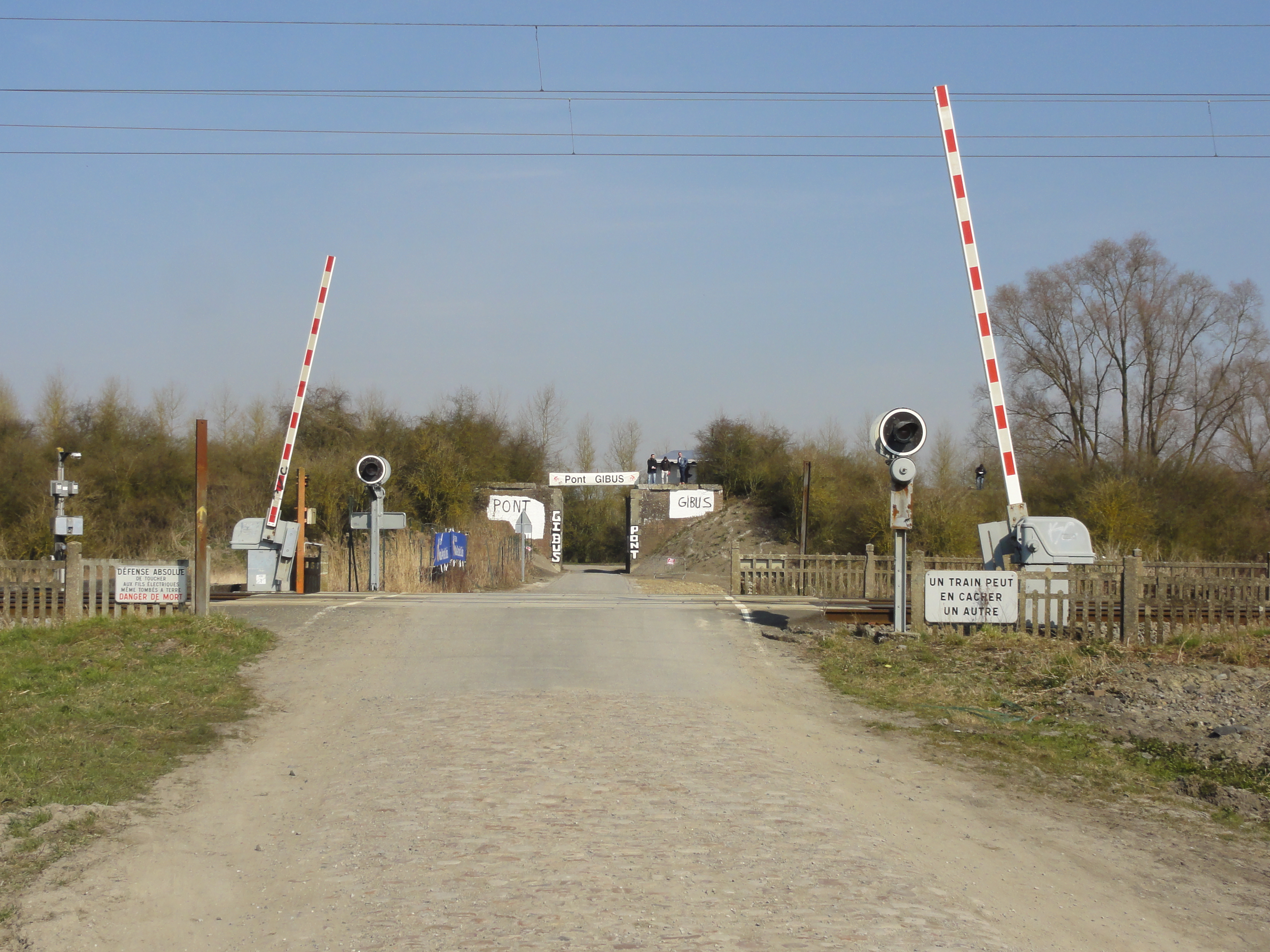
The level crossing, the day of the 2013 Paris–Roubaix

The race was marred by controversy when it emerged that dozens of cyclists had unsafely crossed a level crossing while the barriers were down. Further cyclists were only stopped from crossing when a police motorcyclist intervened. Seconds later, an SNCF TGV high-speed train passed through the crossing.

The SNCF called for police to take action following the incident, stating that there could easily have been a tragedy.
