= Awoingt =

- Commune
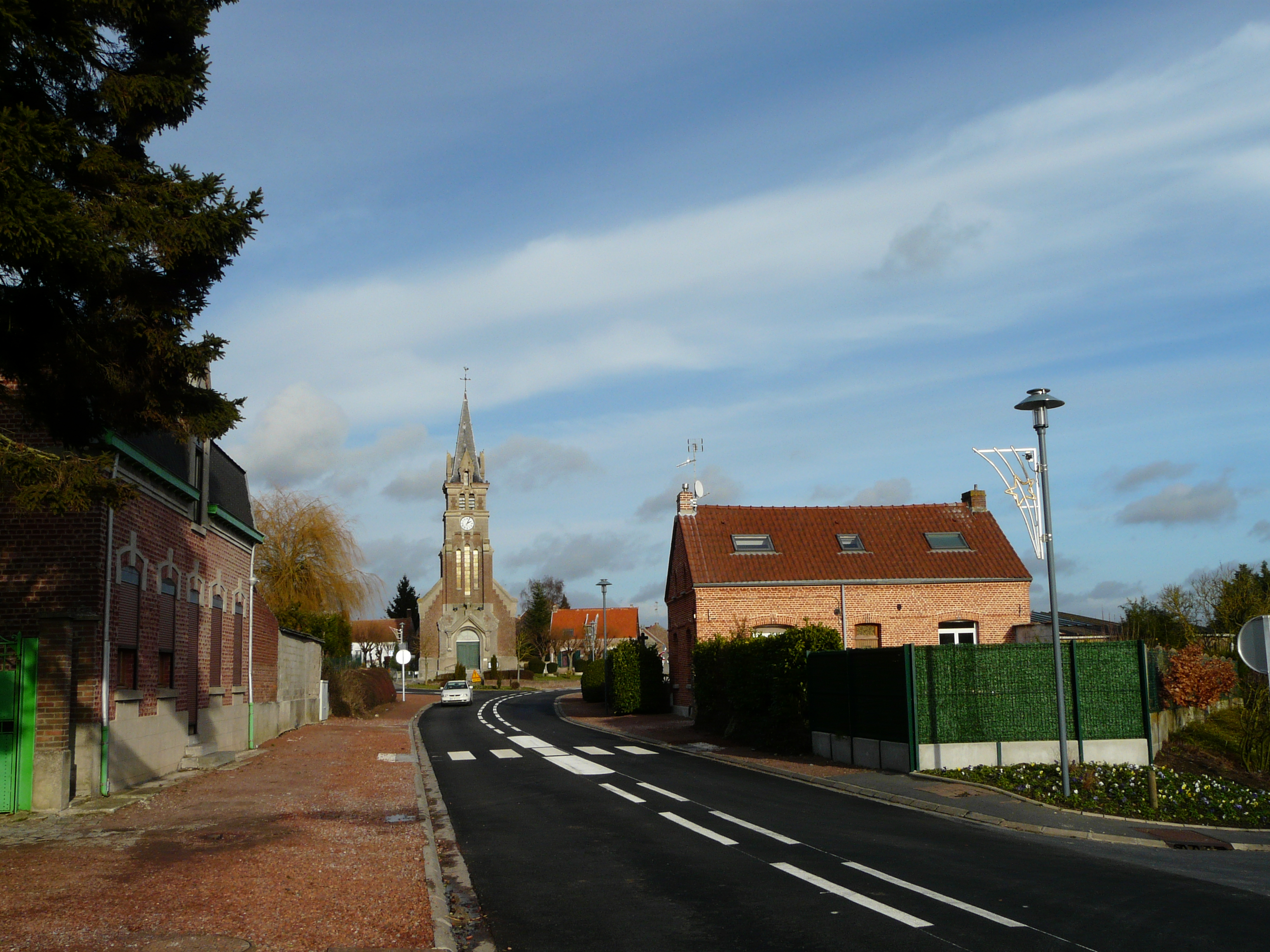
- The church and surroundings in Awoingt

- Coat of arms
- Location of Awoingt
- Location within France Location within Hauts-de-France
- Coordinates: 50°09′20″N 3°16′52″E
- Country: France
- Region: Hauts-de-France
- Department: Nord
- Arrondissement: Cambrai
- Canton: Le Cateau-Cambrésis
- Intercommunality: CA Cambrai

Government
  - Mayor (2020–2026): Eddy Dherbécourt
- Area^{1}: 6.31 km^{2} (2.44 sq mi)
- Elevation: 60 m (200 ft)
- Highest elevation: 101 m (331 ft)
- Lowest elevation: 61 m (200 ft)
- Population (2023): 757
  - Density: 120/km^{2} (311/sq mi)
- Time zone: UTC+01:00 (CET)
  - Summer (DST): UTC+02:00 (CEST)
- INSEE/Postal code: 59039 /59400
- ^{1} French Land Register data, which excludes lakes, ponds, glaciers > 1 km^{2} (0.386 sq mi or 247 acres) and river estuaries.

Awoingt (French pronunciation: [awɛ̃]) is a commune in the Nord department in northern France. It is 4 km (2.5 mi) southeast of the centre of Cambrai.

== Population ==
Historical population
Year	Pop.	±% p.a.
1968	353	—
1975	391	+1.47%
1982	447	+1.93%
1990	524	+2.01%
1999	552	+0.58%
2007	533	−0.44%
2012	857	+9.96%
2017	817	−0.95%
2023	757	−1.26%
Source: INSEE

== Heraldry ==
Arms of Awoingt	The arms of Awoingt are blazoned : Argent, on a bend azure, 3 escallops bendwise Or. (Awoingt and Montrécourt use the same arms.)

== See also ==
- Communes of the Nord department
