= Gonnelieu =

- Commune
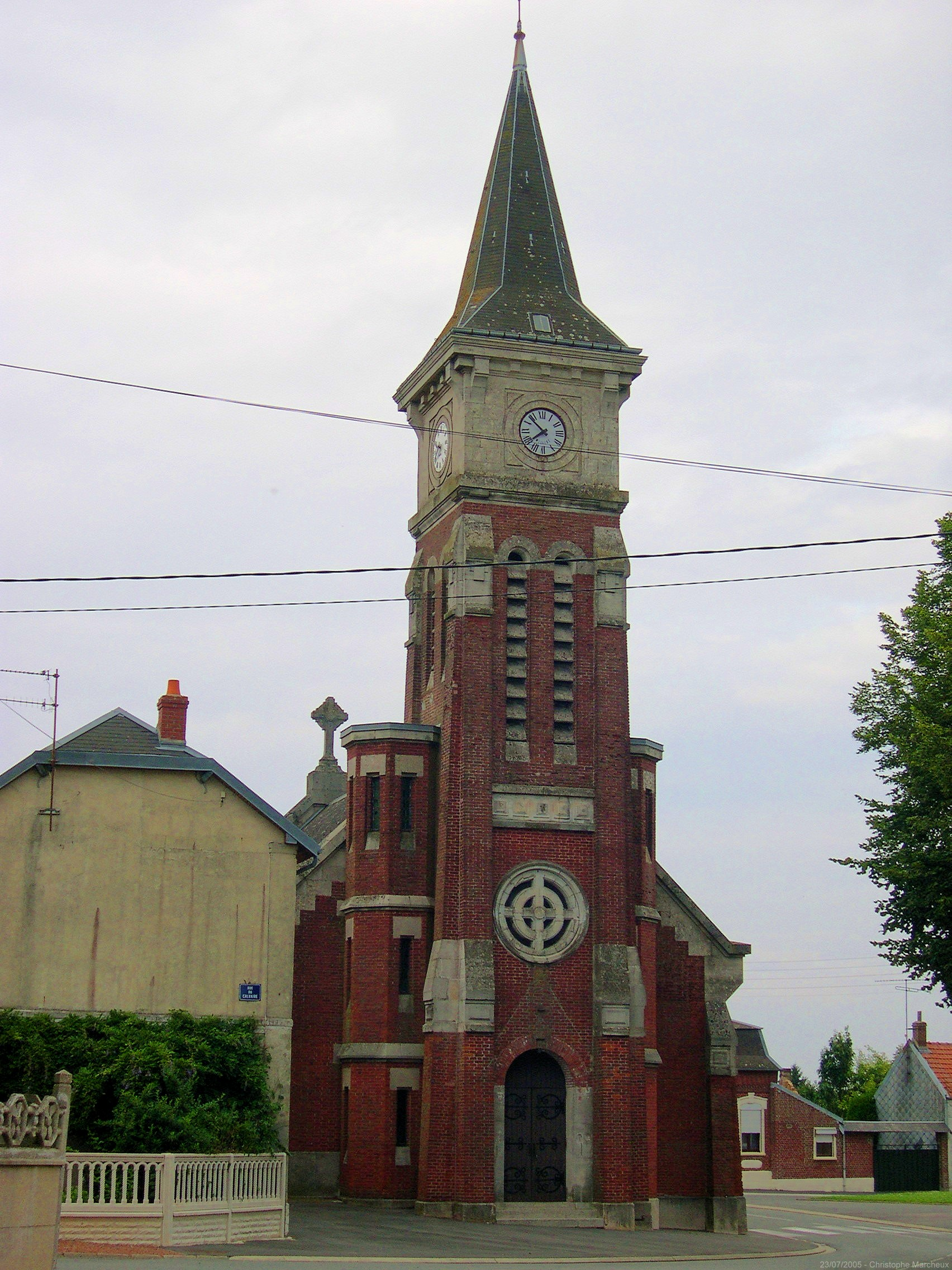
- The church in Gonnelieu

- Coat of arms
- Location of Gonnelieu
- Location within France Location within Hauts-de-France
- Coordinates: 50°03′31″N 3°09′14″E
- Country: France
- Region: Hauts-de-France
- Department: Nord
- Arrondissement: Cambrai
- Canton: Le Cateau-Cambrésis
- Intercommunality: CA Cambrai

Government
  - Mayor (2020–2026): Karine Morelle
- Area^{1}: 4.97 km^{2} (1.92 sq mi)
- Highest elevation: 137 m (449 ft)
- Lowest elevation: 89 m (292 ft)
- Population (2023): 279
  - Density: 56.1/km^{2} (145/sq mi)
- Time zone: UTC+01:00 (CET)
  - Summer (DST): UTC+02:00 (CEST)
- INSEE/Postal code: 59267 /59231
- ^{1} French Land Register data, which excludes lakes, ponds, glaciers > 1 km^{2} (0.386 sq mi or 247 acres) and river estuaries.

Gonnelieu (French pronunciation: [ɡɔnəljø]) is a commune in the Nord department in northern France.

== History ==
During World War I, the town was captured by the German Empire during the Battle of Cambrai in 1917. The action is also very important to the subsequent history of modern Welsh-language literature, as the iconic poet Saunders Lewis was severely wounded in action at Gonnelieu while serving as a Lieutenant in the South Wales Borderers. Lt. Lewis needed more than a year to recover from his injuries, and never returned to active service, but dated his own drift towards Welsh nationalism and his decision to write primarily in Welsh rather than in English from his combat experiences in the war.

== Heraldry ==
Arms of Gonnelieu	The arms of Gonnelieu are blazoned : Or, a bend sable. (Flesquières, Gonnelieu, Mons-en-Barœul and Viesly use the same arms.)

== See also ==
- Communes of the Nord department
