= Béthencourt =

- Commune
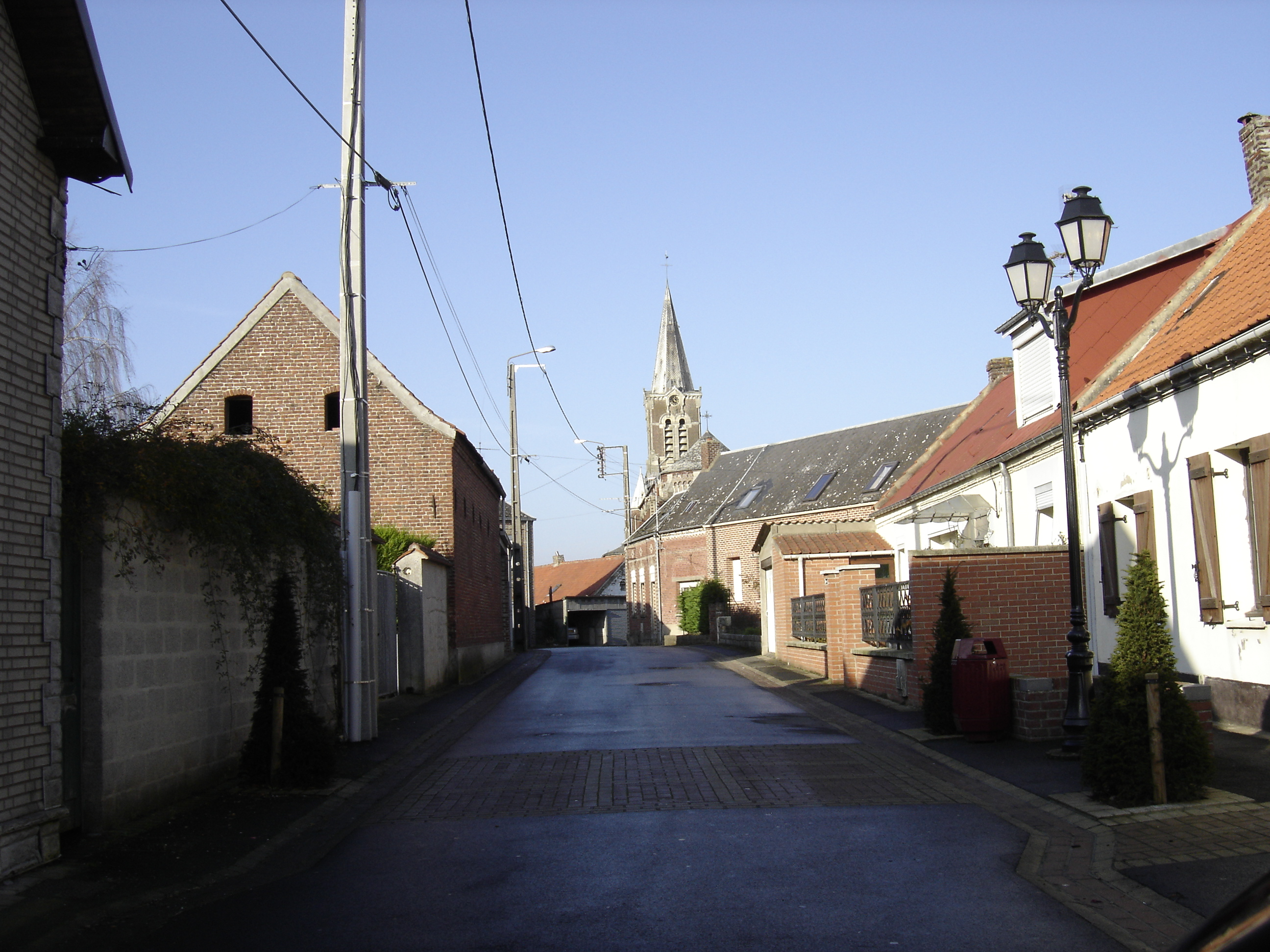
- A view within Béthencourt

- Coat of arms
- Location of Béthencourt
- Location within France Location within Hauts-de-France
- Coordinates: 50°08′14″N 3°26′02″E
- Country: France
- Region: Hauts-de-France
- Department: Nord
- Arrondissement: Cambrai
- Canton: Caudry
- Intercommunality: CA Caudrésis–Catésis

Government
  - Mayor (2020–2026): Paul Souply
- Area^{1}: 5.15 km^{2} (1.99 sq mi)
- Elevation: 110 m (360 ft)
- Highest elevation: 121 m (397 ft)
- Lowest elevation: 87 m (285 ft)
- Population (2023): 689
  - Density: 134/km^{2} (347/sq mi)
- Time zone: UTC+01:00 (CET)
  - Summer (DST): UTC+02:00 (CEST)
- INSEE/Postal code: 59075 /59540
- ^{1} French Land Register data, which excludes lakes, ponds, glaciers > 1 km^{2} (0.386 sq mi or 247 acres) and river estuaries.

Béthencourt (French pronunciation: [betɑ̃kuʁ]) is a commune in the Nord department in northern France.

== Population ==
Historical population
Year	Pop.	±% p.a.
1968	933	—
1975	839	−1.51%
1982	766	−1.29%
1990	694	−1.23%
1999	677	−0.28%
2007	732	+0.98%
2012	764	+0.86%
2017	749	−0.40%
2023	689	−1.38%
Source: INSEE

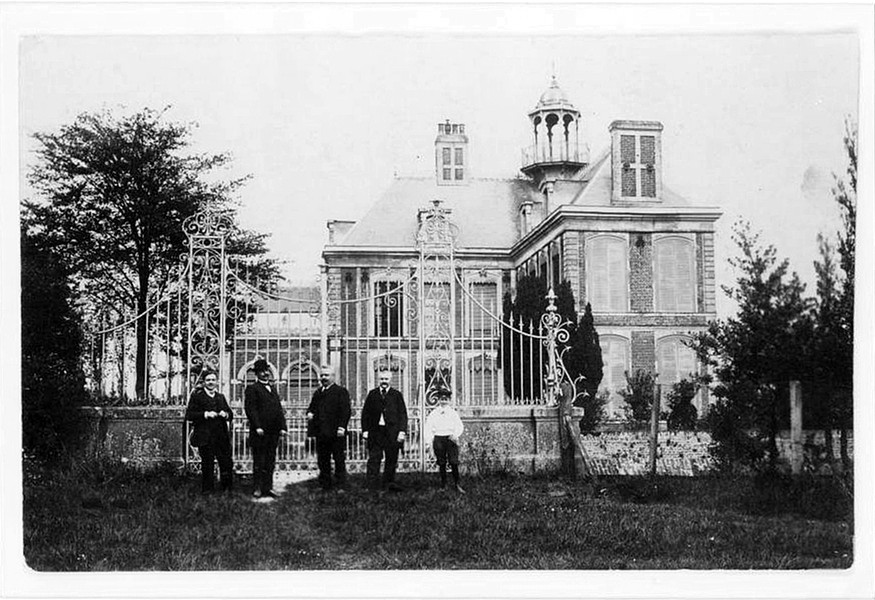
Castle before 1914

== Heraldry ==
Arms of Béthencourt	The arms of Béthencourt are blazoned : Sable, 10 lozenges conjoined Or, 3, 3, 3, 1.

== See also ==
- Communes of the Nord department
