= Flesquières =

- Commune
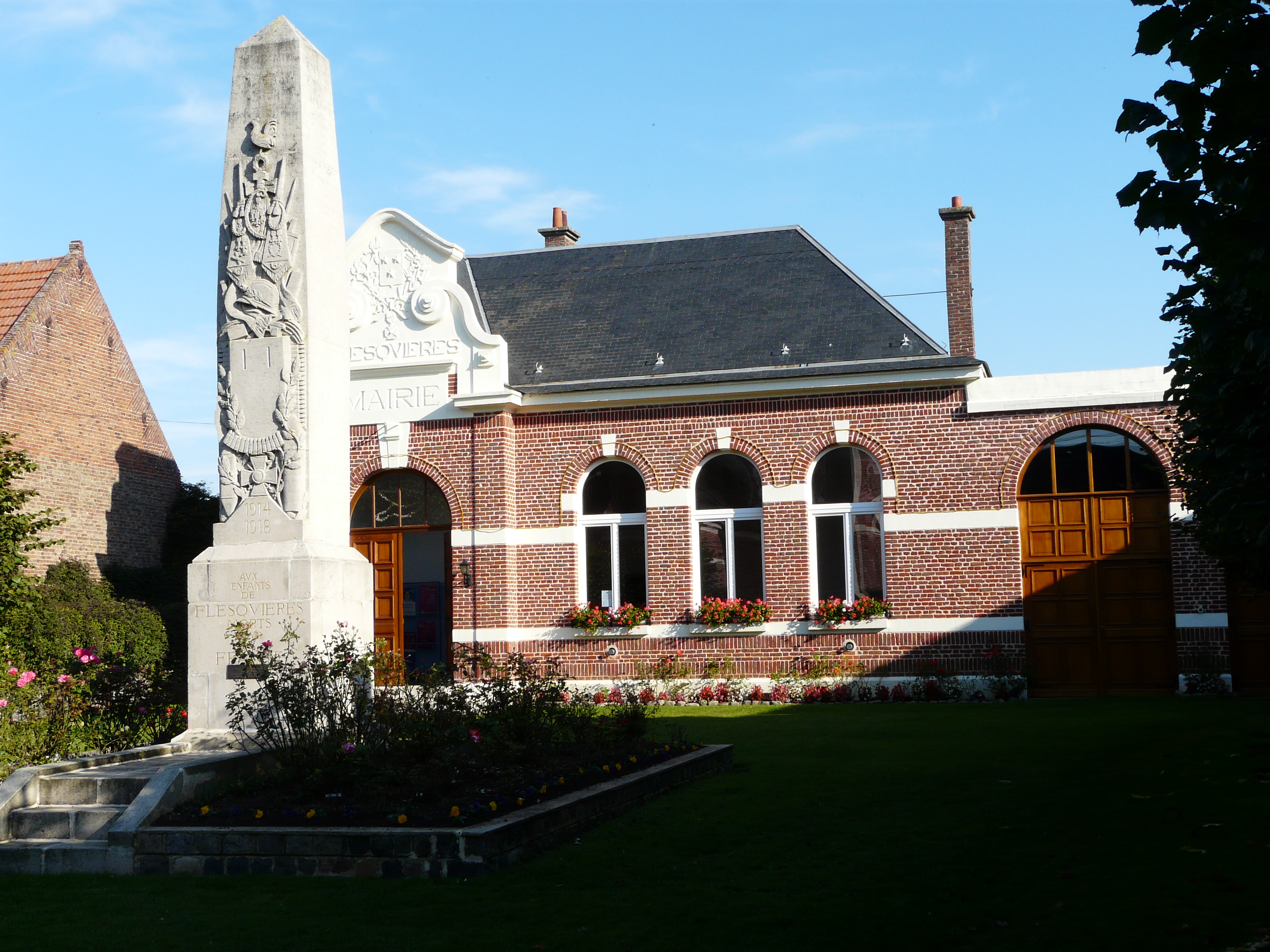
- The town hall in Flesquières

- Coat of arms
- Location of Flesquières
- Location within France Location within Hauts-de-France
- Coordinates: 50°07′26″N 3°07′01″E
- Country: France
- Region: Hauts-de-France
- Department: Nord
- Arrondissement: Cambrai
- Canton: Le Cateau-Cambrésis
- Intercommunality: CA Cambrai

Government
  - Mayor (2023–2026): Billy Journet
- Area^{1}: 6.28 km^{2} (2.42 sq mi)
- Elevation: 105 m (344 ft)
- Highest elevation: 108 m (354 ft)
- Lowest elevation: 67 m (220 ft)
- Population (2023): 276
  - Density: 43.9/km^{2} (114/sq mi)
- Time zone: UTC+01:00 (CET)
  - Summer (DST): UTC+02:00 (CEST)
- INSEE/Postal code: 59236 /59267
- ^{1} French Land Register data, which excludes lakes, ponds, glaciers > 1 km^{2} (0.386 sq mi or 247 acres) and river estuaries.

Flesquières (French pronunciation: [flɛkjɛʁ]) is a commune in the Nord department in northern France.

== Heraldry ==
Arms of Flesquières	The arms of Flesquières are blazoned : Or, a bend sable. (Flesquières, Gonnelieu, Mons-en-Barœul and Viesly use the same arms.)

== See also ==
- Communes of the Nord department
- Marcel Gaumont. Sculpture on church
