= Canton of Caudry =

Administrative division of northern France

Coordinates: 50.12°N 3.41°E

The canton of Caudry is an administrative division of the Nord department, northern France. It was created at the French canton reorganisation which came into effect in March 2015. Its seat is in Caudry.

It consists of the following communes:

1. Avesnes-les-Aubert
2. Beaurain
3. Beauvois-en-Cambrésis
4. Bermerain
5. Béthencourt
6. Bévillers
7. Boussières-en-Cambrésis
8. Cagnoncles
9. Capelle
10. Carnières
11. Caudry
12. Cauroir
13. Escarmain
14. Estourmel
15. Haussy
16. Iwuy
17. Montrécourt
18. Naves
19. Quiévy
20. Rieux-en-Cambrésis
21. Romeries
22. Saint-Aubert
23. Saint-Hilaire-lez-Cambrai
24. Saint-Martin-sur-Écaillon
25. Saint-Python
26. Saint-Vaast-en-Cambrésis
27. Saulzoir
28. Solesmes
29. Sommaing
30. Vendegies-sur-Écaillon
31. Vertain
32. Viesly
33. Villers-en-Cauchies
