= Sommaing =

- Commune
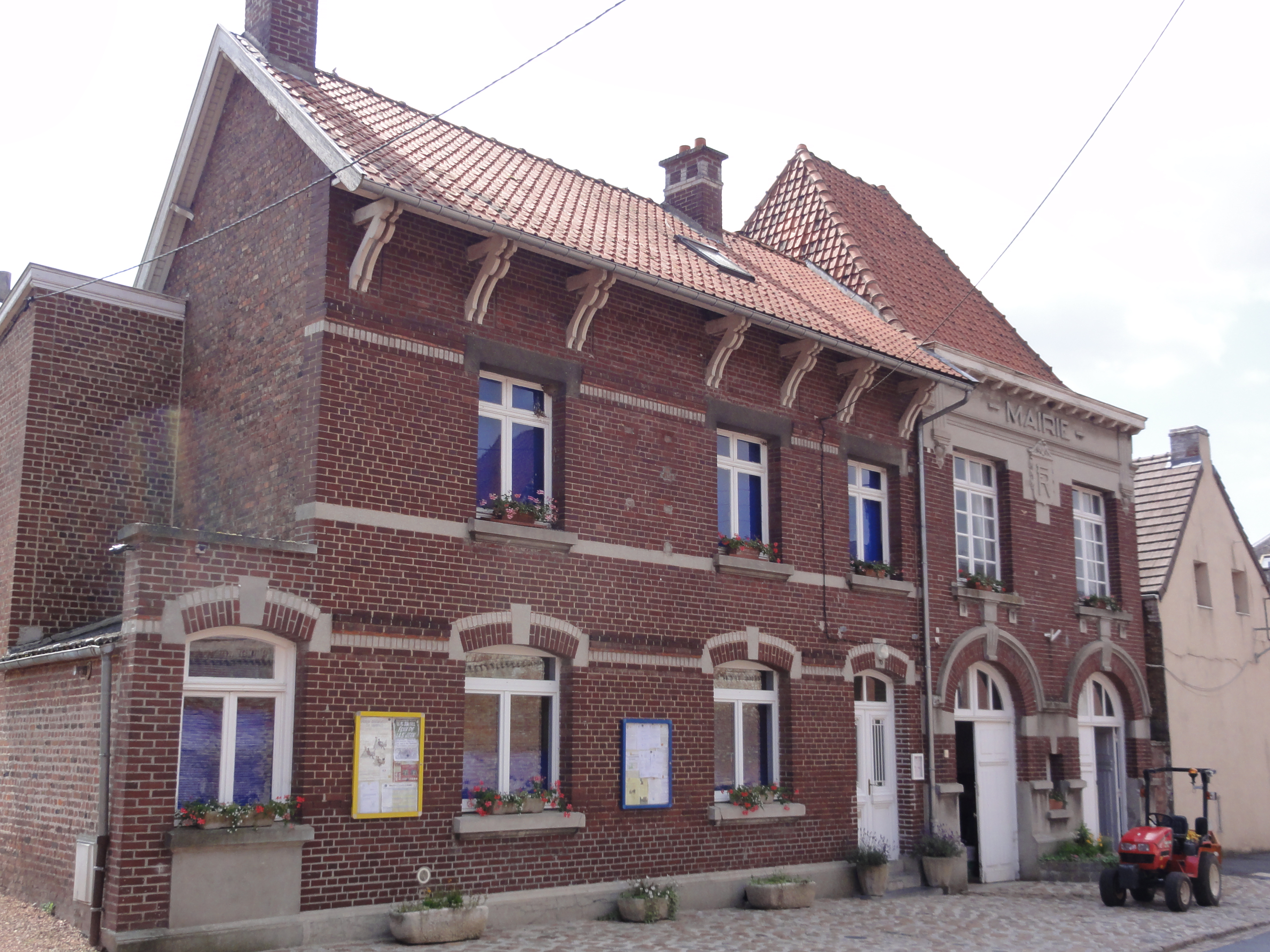
- The town hall in Sommaing

- Coat of arms
- Location of Sommaing
- Location within France Location within Hauts-de-France
- Coordinates: 50°15′58″N 3°29′59″E
- Country: France
- Region: Hauts-de-France
- Department: Nord
- Arrondissement: Cambrai
- Canton: Caudry
- Intercommunality: CC Pays Solesmois

Government
  - Mayor (2020–2026): Roland Salengro
- Area^{1}: 3.6 km^{2} (1.4 sq mi)
- Elevation: 50 m (160 ft)
- Highest elevation: 95 m (312 ft)
- Lowest elevation: 37 m (121 ft)
- Population (2023): 397
  - Density: 110/km^{2} (290/sq mi)
- Time zone: UTC+01:00 (CET)
  - Summer (DST): UTC+02:00 (CEST)
- INSEE/Postal code: 59575 /59213
- ^{1} French Land Register data, which excludes lakes, ponds, glaciers > 1 km^{2} (0.386 sq mi or 247 acres) and river estuaries.

Sommaing (French pronunciation: [sɔmɛ̃]) is a commune in the Nord department in northern France.

== Heraldry ==
Arms of Sommaing	The arms of Sommaing are blazoned : Argent, a lion gules within a bordure engrailed azure.

== See also ==
- Communes of the Nord department
