= Saint-Vaast-en-Cambrésis =

- Commune
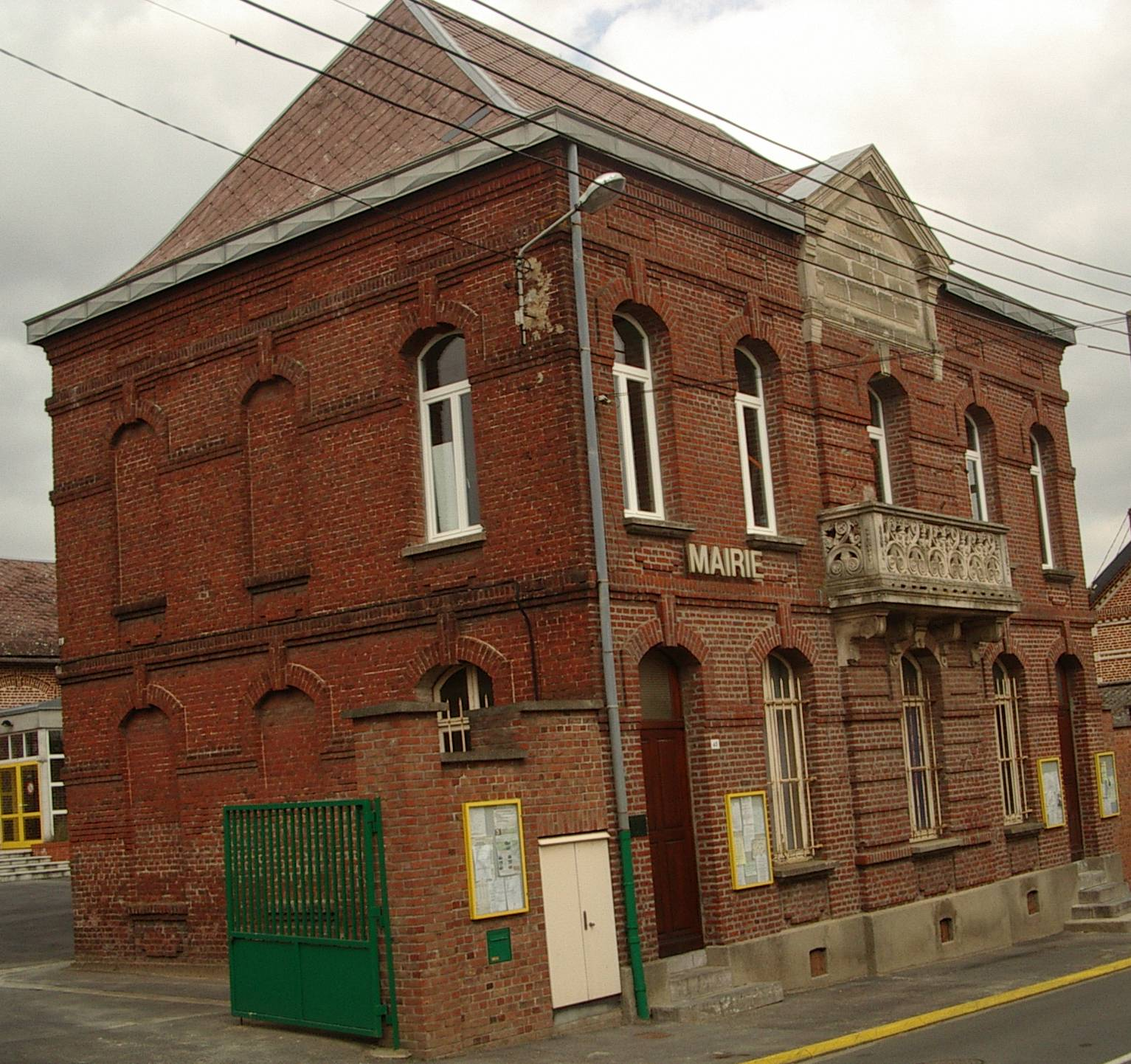
- The town hall in Saint-Vaast-en-Cambrésis

- Coat of arms
- Location of Saint-Vaast-en-Cambrésis
- Location within France Location within Hauts-de-France
- Coordinates: 50°11′36″N 3°25′30″E
- Country: France
- Region: Hauts-de-France
- Department: Nord
- Arrondissement: Cambrai
- Canton: Caudry
- Intercommunality: CA Caudrésis–Catésis

Government
  - Mayor (2020–2026): Stéphane Jumeaux
- Area^{1}: 4.42 km^{2} (1.71 sq mi)
- Elevation: 89 m (292 ft)
- Highest elevation: 100 m (330 ft)
- Lowest elevation: 67 m (220 ft)
- Population (2023): 871
  - Density: 197/km^{2} (510/sq mi)
- Time zone: UTC+01:00 (CET)
  - Summer (DST): UTC+02:00 (CEST)
- INSEE/Postal code: 59547 /59188
- ^{1} French Land Register data, which excludes lakes, ponds, glaciers > 1 km^{2} (0.386 sq mi or 247 acres) and river estuaries.

Saint-Vaast-en-Cambrésis (French pronunciation: [sɛ̃ va.st‿ɑ̃ kɑ̃bʁezi]) is a commune in the Nord department in northern France. It is named after the 6th century Saint Vedast.

== Heraldry ==
Arms of Saint-Vaast-en-Cambrésis	The arms of Saint-Vaast-en-Cambrésis are blazoned : Azure, a double-headed eagle Or, beaked and membered gules.

== French sartorial heritage ==
The city was a pivotal center of mulquinerie.

== See also ==
- Communes of the Nord department
- Chemin de fer du Cambrésis
