= Vendegies-sur-Écaillon =

- Commune
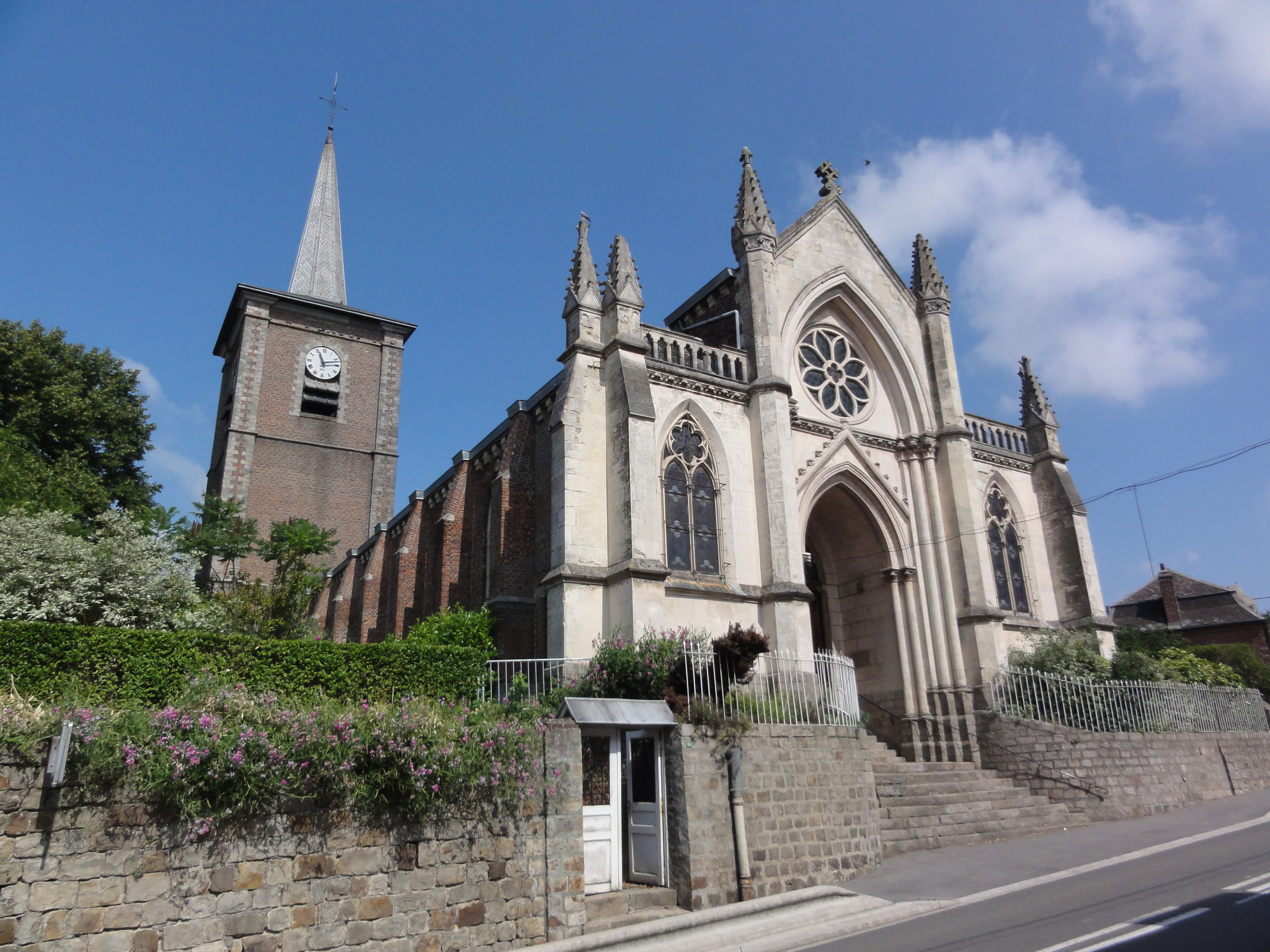
- The church in Vendegies-sur-Écaillon

- Coat of arms
- Location of Vendegies-sur-Écaillon
- Location within France Location within Hauts-de-France
- Coordinates: 50°15′46″N 3°30′44″E
- Country: France
- Region: Hauts-de-France
- Department: Nord
- Arrondissement: Cambrai
- Canton: Caudry
- Intercommunality: CC Pays Solesmois

Government
  - Mayor (2021–2026): Jean Faure
- Area^{1}: 6.57 km^{2} (2.54 sq mi)
- Elevation: 54 m (177 ft)
- Highest elevation: 102 m (335 ft)
- Lowest elevation: 44 m (144 ft)
- Population (2023): 1,123
  - Density: 171/km^{2} (443/sq mi)
- Time zone: UTC+01:00 (CET)
  - Summer (DST): UTC+02:00 (CEST)
- INSEE/Postal code: 59608 /59213
- ^{1} French Land Register data, which excludes lakes, ponds, glaciers > 1 km^{2} (0.386 sq mi or 247 acres) and river estuaries.

Vendegies-sur-Écaillon (French pronunciation: [vɑ̃d(ə)ʒi syʁ ekajɔ̃]) is a commune in the Nord department in northern France.

== History ==
In his memoir of World War I, A S Bullock recalls the night of 24 October 1918 when he was among the reserves helping the Gloucestershire Regiment in a final push against the Germans at Vendegies-sur-Écaillon. He notes that although 'maps were scarce', he managed not only to obtain one but to retain it after the war, complete with mud from the battlefield.

Bullock recalls marching on from Vendegies-sur-Écaillon to Sepmeries, where on 27 October he narrowly escaped death at a spot in square Q12 of this same map.

== Heraldry ==
Arms of Vendegies-sur-Écaillon	The arms of Vendegies-sur-Écaillon are blazoned : Or, a 6-spoked wheel gules.

== See also ==
- Communes of the Nord department
