= Montrécourt =

- Commune
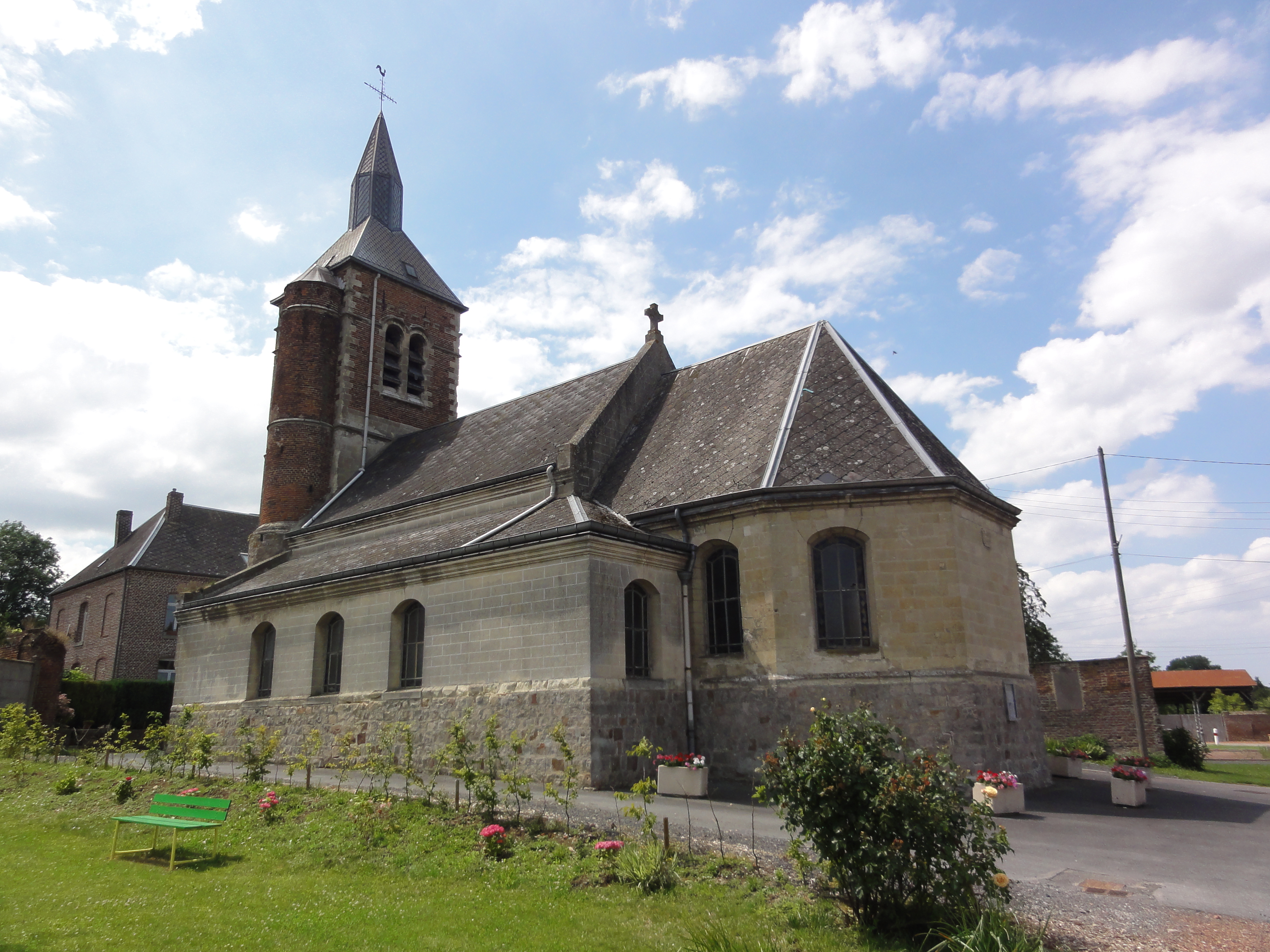
- The church in Montrécourt

- Coat of arms
- Location of Montrécourt
- Location within France Location within Hauts-de-France
- Coordinates: 50°13′59″N 3°27′07″E
- Country: France
- Region: Hauts-de-France
- Department: Nord
- Arrondissement: Cambrai
- Canton: Caudry
- Intercommunality: CC Pays Solesmois

Government
  - Mayor (2020–2026): Marc Guillez
- Area^{1}: 3.56 km^{2} (1.37 sq mi)
- Highest elevation: 85 m (279 ft)
- Lowest elevation: 47 m (154 ft)
- Population (2023): 228
  - Density: 64.0/km^{2} (166/sq mi)
- Time zone: UTC+01:00 (CET)
  - Summer (DST): UTC+02:00 (CEST)
- INSEE/Postal code: 59415 /59227
- ^{1} French Land Register data, which excludes lakes, ponds, glaciers > 1 km^{2} (0.386 sq mi or 247 acres) and river estuaries.

Montrécourt (French pronunciation: [mɔ̃tʁekuʁ]) is a commune in the Nord department in northern France.

It is one of the smallest, least populated communes of Nord.

== Heraldry ==
Arms of Montrécourt	The arms of Montrécourt are blazoned : Argent, on a bend azure, 3 escallops bendwise Or. (Awoingt and Montrécourt use the same arms.)

== See also ==
- Communes of the Nord department
