= Saulzoir =

- Commune
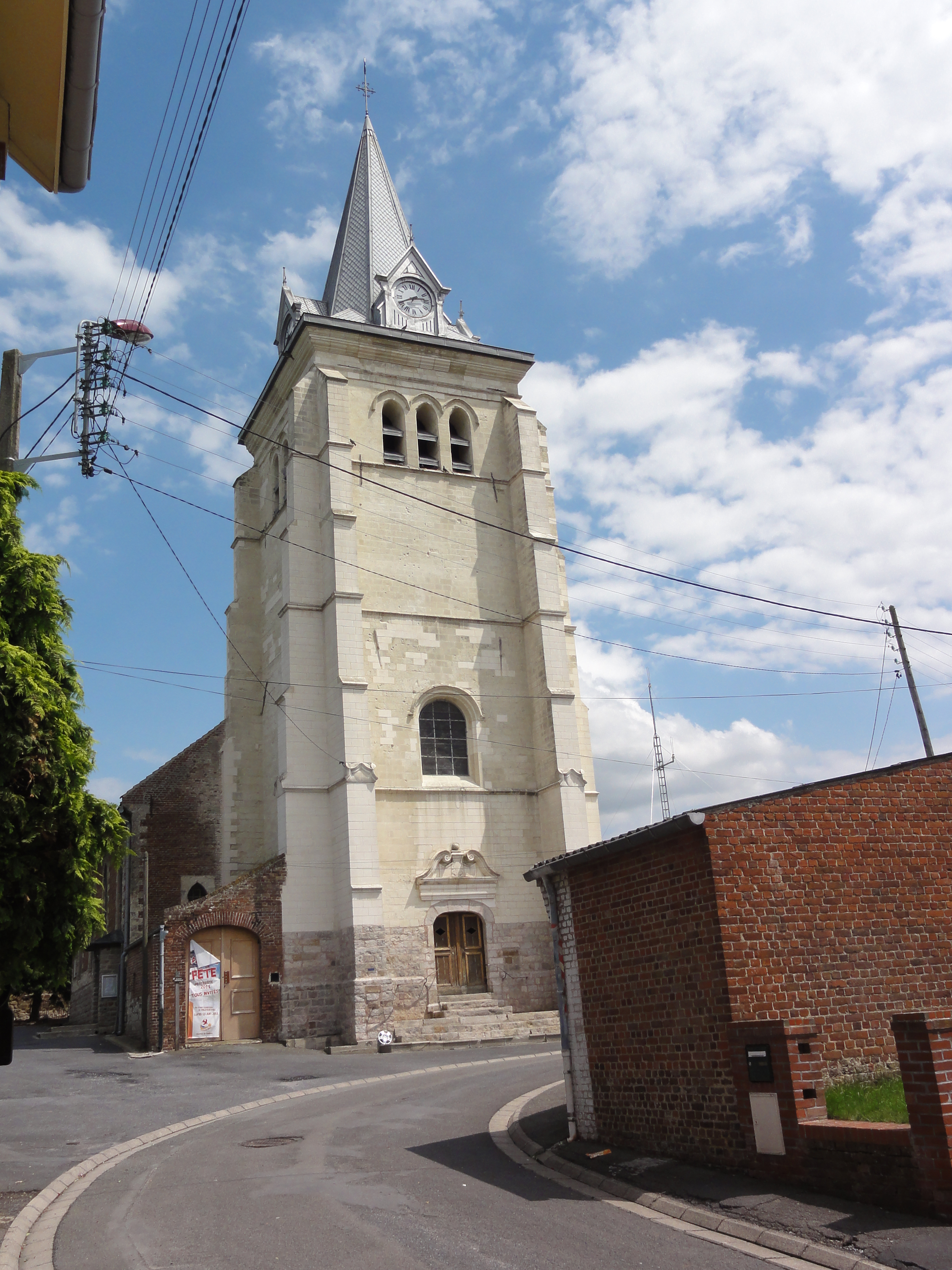
- The church in Saulzoir

- Coat of arms
- Location of Saulzoir
- Location within France Location within Hauts-de-France
- Coordinates: 50°14′29″N 3°26′41″E
- Country: France
- Region: Hauts-de-France
- Department: Nord
- Arrondissement: Cambrai
- Canton: Caudry
- Intercommunality: CC Pays Solesmois

Government
  - Mayor (2020–2026): Gilbert Gernet
- Area^{1}: 10.1 km^{2} (3.9 sq mi)
- Elevation: 65.5 m (215 ft)
- Highest elevation: 88 m (289 ft)
- Lowest elevation: 43 m (141 ft)
- Population (2023): 1,672
  - Density: 166/km^{2} (429/sq mi)
- Time zone: UTC+01:00 (CET)
  - Summer (DST): UTC+02:00 (CEST)
- INSEE/Postal code: 59558 /59227
- ^{1} French Land Register data, which excludes lakes, ponds, glaciers > 1 km^{2} (0.386 sq mi or 247 acres) and river estuaries.

Saulzoir (French pronunciation: [solzwaʁ]) is a commune in the Nord department in northern France.

It is situated on the river Selle and has about 1700 inhabitants (2019). The town was the site of Julius Caesar's battle against the Nervians.

== Heraldry ==
Arms of Saulzoir	The arms of Saulzoir are blazoned : Azure, a crescent between 11 billets (in chief in fess 5, in base 3,2,1) Or.

== See also ==
- Communes of the Nord department
