= Haveluy =

- Commune
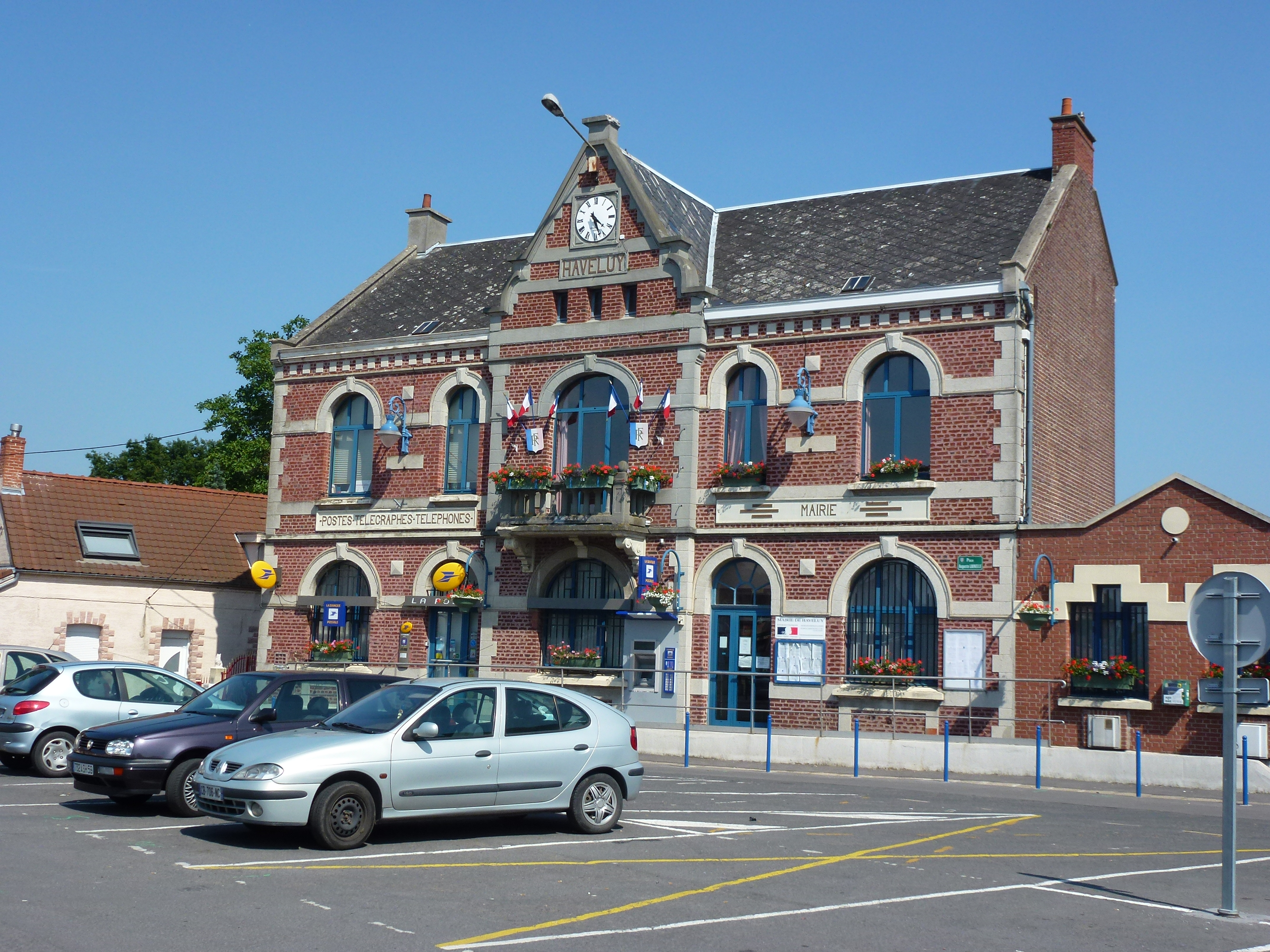
- The town hall in Haveluy

- Coat of arms
- Location of Haveluy
- Location within France Location within Hauts-de-France
- Coordinates: 50°21′04″N 3°24′11″E
- Country: France
- Region: Hauts-de-France
- Department: Nord
- Arrondissement: Valenciennes
- Canton: Aulnoy-lez-Valenciennes
- Intercommunality: CA Porte du Hainaut

Government
  - Mayor (2020–2026): Jean-Paul Ryckelynck
- Area^{1}: 4.7 km^{2} (1.8 sq mi)
- Elevation: 32 m (105 ft)
- Highest elevation: 70 m (230 ft)
- Lowest elevation: 21 m (69 ft)
- Population (2023): 3,222
  - Density: 690/km^{2} (1,800/sq mi)
- Time zone: UTC+01:00 (CET)
  - Summer (DST): UTC+02:00 (CEST)
- INSEE/Postal code: 59292 /59255
- ^{1} French Land Register data, which excludes lakes, ponds, glaciers > 1 km^{2} (0.386 sq mi or 247 acres) and river estuaries.

Haveluy (French pronunciation: [avlɥi]) is a commune in the Nord department in northern France.

== Population ==
Historical population
Year	Pop.	±% p.a.
1968	3,998	—
1975	3,616	−1.42%
1982	3,266	−1.44%
1990	3,046	−0.87%
1999	3,084	+0.14%
2007	3,175	+0.36%
2012	3,089	−0.55%
2017	3,174	+0.54%
2023	3,222	+0.25%
Source: INSEE

== Heraldry ==
Arms of Haveluy	The arms of Haveluy are blazoned : Argent, 3 bars gemel gules. (Haveluy and Vertain use the same arms.)

== See also ==
- Communes of the Nord department
