= Viesly =

- Commune
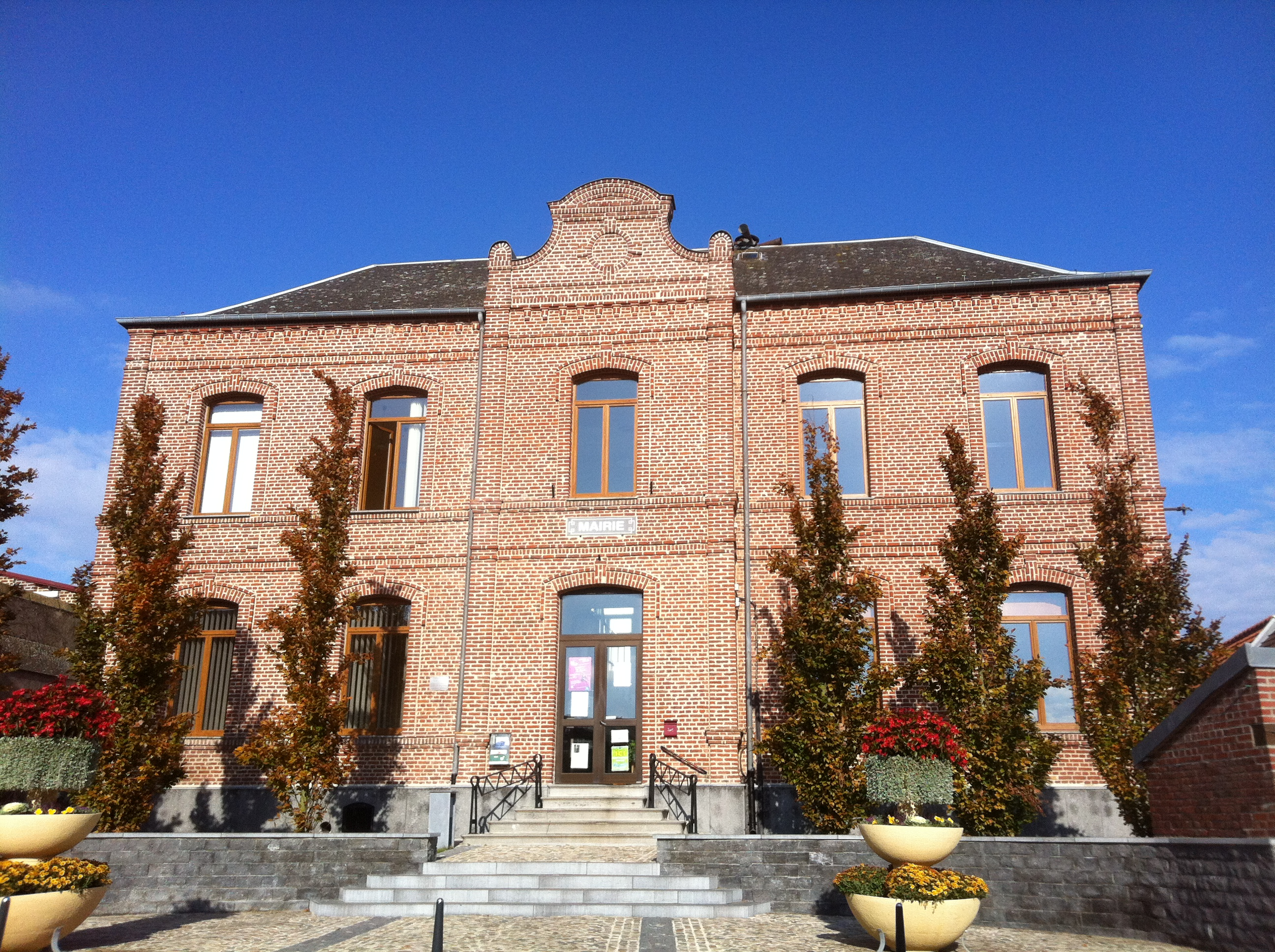
- The town hall in Viesly

- Coat of arms
- Location of Viesly
- Location within France Location within Hauts-de-France
- Coordinates: 50°09′14″N 3°27′53″E
- Country: France
- Region: Hauts-de-France
- Department: Nord
- Arrondissement: Cambrai
- Canton: Caudry
- Intercommunality: CC Pays Solesmois

Government
  - Mayor (2020–2026): Denis Delsart
- Area^{1}: 10.67 km^{2} (4.12 sq mi)
- Elevation: 120 m (390 ft)
- Highest elevation: 129 m (423 ft)
- Lowest elevation: 85 m (279 ft)
- Population (2023): 1,364
  - Density: 127.8/km^{2} (331.1/sq mi)
- Time zone: UTC+01:00 (CET)
  - Summer (DST): UTC+02:00 (CEST)
- INSEE/Postal code: 59614 /59271
- ^{1} French Land Register data, which excludes lakes, ponds, glaciers > 1 km^{2} (0.386 sq mi or 247 acres) and river estuaries.

Viesly (French pronunciation: [vjeli]) is a commune in the Nord department in northern France.

== Heraldry ==
Arms of Viesly	The arms of Viesly are blazoned : Or, a bend sable. (Flesquières, Gonnelieu, Mons-en-Barœul and Viesly use the same arms.)

== See also ==
- Communes of the Nord department
