= Saint-Martin-sur-Écaillon =

- Commune
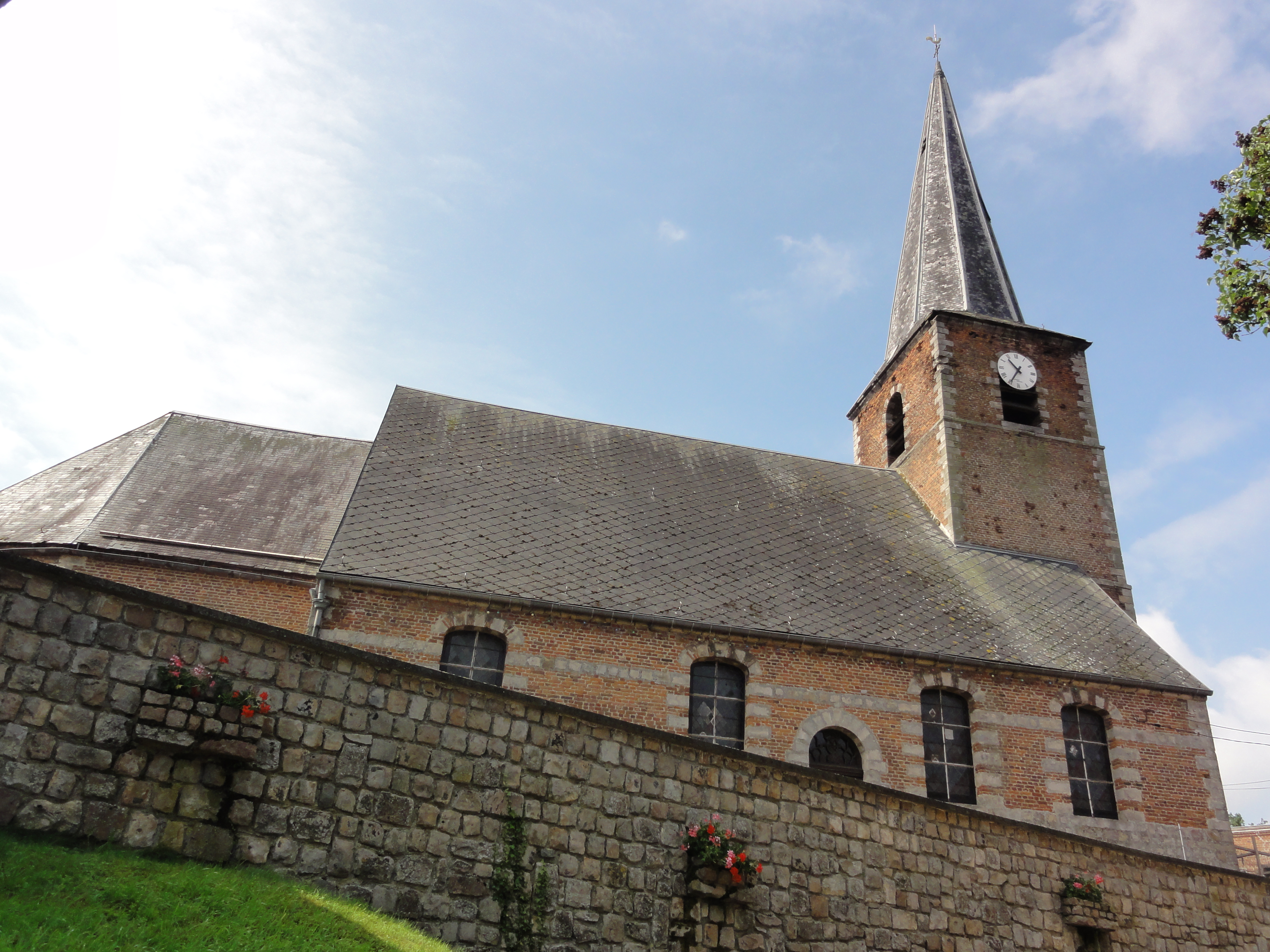
- The church in Saint-Martin-sur-Écaillon

- Coat of arms
- Location of Saint-Martin-sur-Écaillon
- Location within France Location within Hauts-de-France
- Coordinates: 50°14′57″N 3°31′42″E
- Country: France
- Region: Hauts-de-France
- Department: Nord
- Arrondissement: Cambrai
- Canton: Caudry
- Intercommunality: CC Pays Solesmois

Government
  - Mayor (2020–2026): Michel Dhaneus
- Area^{1}: 5.3 km^{2} (2.0 sq mi)
- Highest elevation: 103 m (338 ft)
- Lowest elevation: 48 m (157 ft)
- Population (2023): 483
  - Density: 91/km^{2} (240/sq mi)
- Time zone: UTC+01:00 (CET)
  - Summer (DST): UTC+02:00 (CEST)
- INSEE/Postal code: 59537 /59213
- ^{1} French Land Register data, which excludes lakes, ponds, glaciers > 1 km^{2} (0.386 sq mi or 247 acres) and river estuaries.

Saint-Martin-sur-Écaillon (French pronunciation: [sɛ̃ maʁtɛ̃ syʁ ekajɔ̃]) is a commune in the Nord department in northern France.

== Heraldry ==
Arms of Saint-Martin-sur-Écaillon	The arms of Saint-Martin-sur-Écaillon are blazoned : Gules, semy of coronels argent. (this is an antique lance head that looks like a crown)

== See also ==
- Communes of the Nord department
