= Vertain =

- Commune
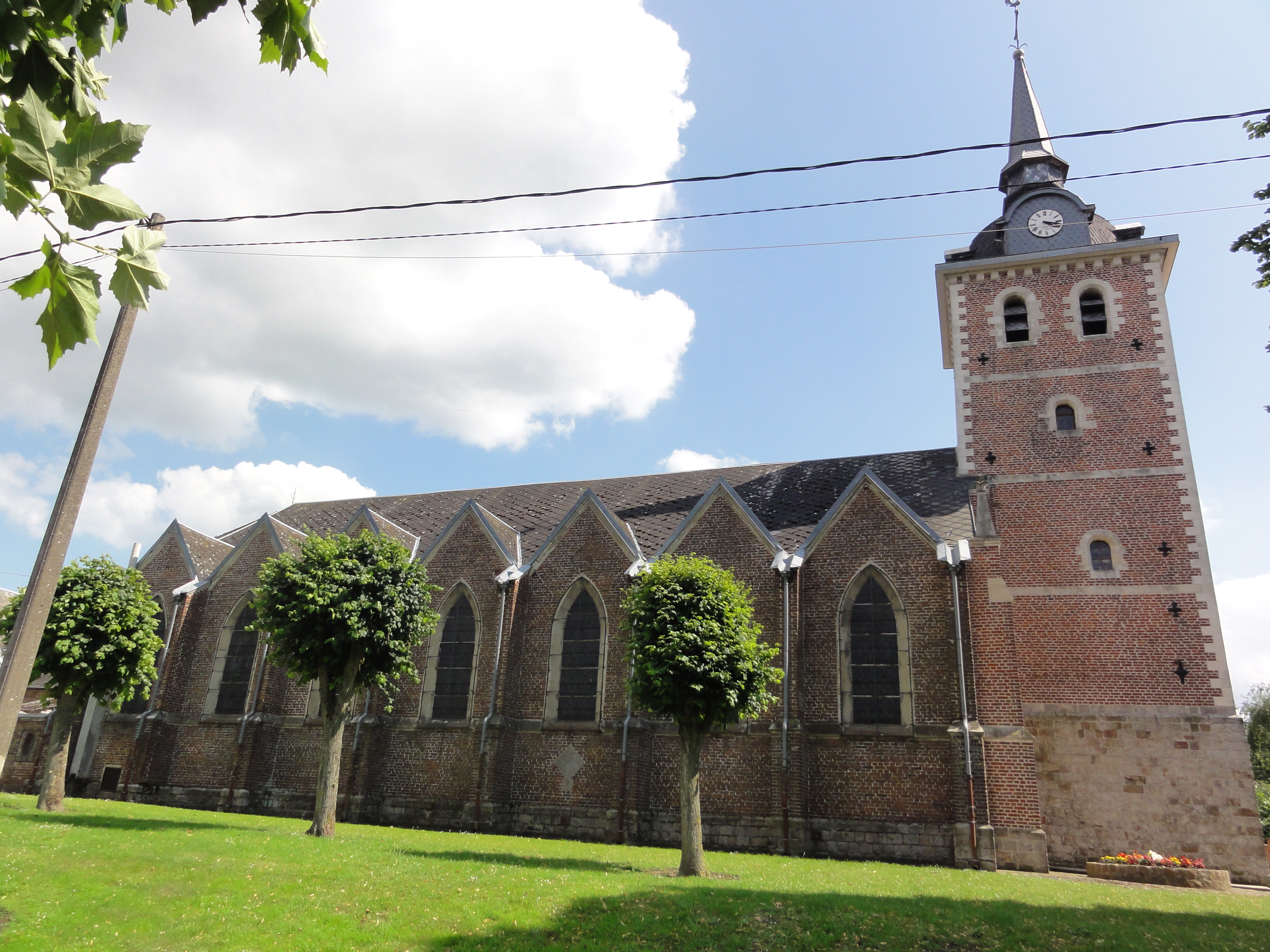
- The church in Vertain

- Coat of arms
- Location of Vertain
- Location within France Location within Hauts-de-France
- Coordinates: 50°12′47″N 3°31′38″E
- Country: France
- Region: Hauts-de-France
- Department: Nord
- Arrondissement: Cambrai
- Canton: Caudry
- Intercommunality: CC Pays Solesmois

Government
  - Mayor (2020–2026): Jean-Marc Lemeiter
- Area^{1}: 5.78 km^{2} (2.23 sq mi)
- Elevation: 100 m (330 ft)
- Highest elevation: 116 m (381 ft)
- Lowest elevation: 76 m (249 ft)
- Population (2023): 535
  - Density: 92.6/km^{2} (240/sq mi)
- Time zone: UTC+01:00 (CET)
  - Summer (DST): UTC+02:00 (CEST)
- INSEE/Postal code: 59612 /59730
- ^{1} French Land Register data, which excludes lakes, ponds, glaciers > 1 km^{2} (0.386 sq mi or 247 acres) and river estuaries.

Vertain (French pronunciation: [vɛʁtɛ̃]) is a commune in the Nord department in northern France.

== Heraldry ==
Arms of Vertain	The arms of Vertain are blazoned : Argent, 3 bars gemel gules. (Haveluy and Vertain use the same arms.)

== See also ==
- Communes of the Nord department
