= 2016 Paris–Roubaix =

2016 UCI World Tour, race 10 of 28
- Official event poster

Race details
- Dates: 10 April 2016
- Stages: 1
- Distance: 257.5 km (160.0 mi)
- Winning time: 5h 51' 53"

Results
	Winner	Mathew Hayman (AUS)	(Orica–GreenEDGE)
	Second	Tom Boonen (BEL)	(Etixx–Quick-Step)
	Third	Ian Stannard (GBR)	(Team Sky)

The 2016 Paris–Roubaix was a one-day classic cycling race that took place on 10 April 2016 in northern France. It was the 114th edition of the Paris–Roubaix and was the tenth race of the 2016 UCI World Tour and the third monument of the season.

The race took place over 257.5 kilometres (160.0 mi). The principal difficulty was provided by the 27 sectors of cobbled roads, which cover a total distance of 52.8 kilometres (32.8 mi). The difficult conditions caused by the cobbles have earned the race the name "the Hell of the North". It came at the end of the cobbled classics season, a week after the 2016 Tour of Flanders; the favourites included the winner of that race, Peter Sagan (Tinkoff), as well as Fabian Cancellara (Trek–Segafredo) and Tom Boonen (Etixx–Quick-Step).

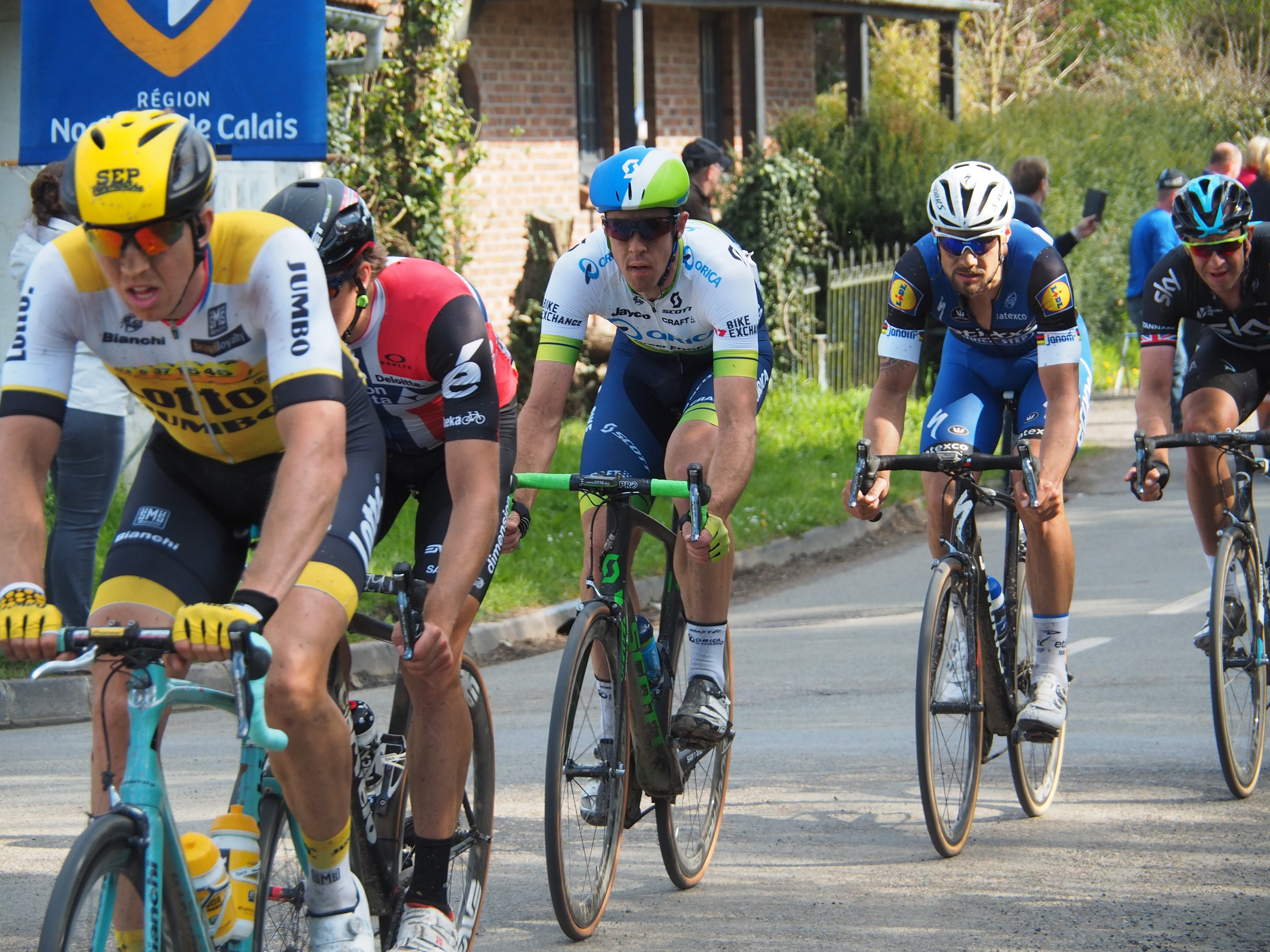
The top five riders, 8 km (5.0 mi) from the finish. From left to right:Sep Vanmarcke, Edvald Boasson Hagen, Mathew Hayman, Tom Boonen and Ian Stannard

The race was hard from the very beginning, with major attacks being made over 100 kilometres (62 mi) from the finish. Cancellara and Sagan were held up by crashes and a five-rider group formed in the final 20 kilometres (12 mi) and, despite many more attacks in the closing part of the race, came to the velodrome in Roubaix together. The sprint was won by Mathew Hayman (Orica–GreenEDGE) ahead of Boonen, with Ian Stannard (Team Sky) in third.

== Route ==
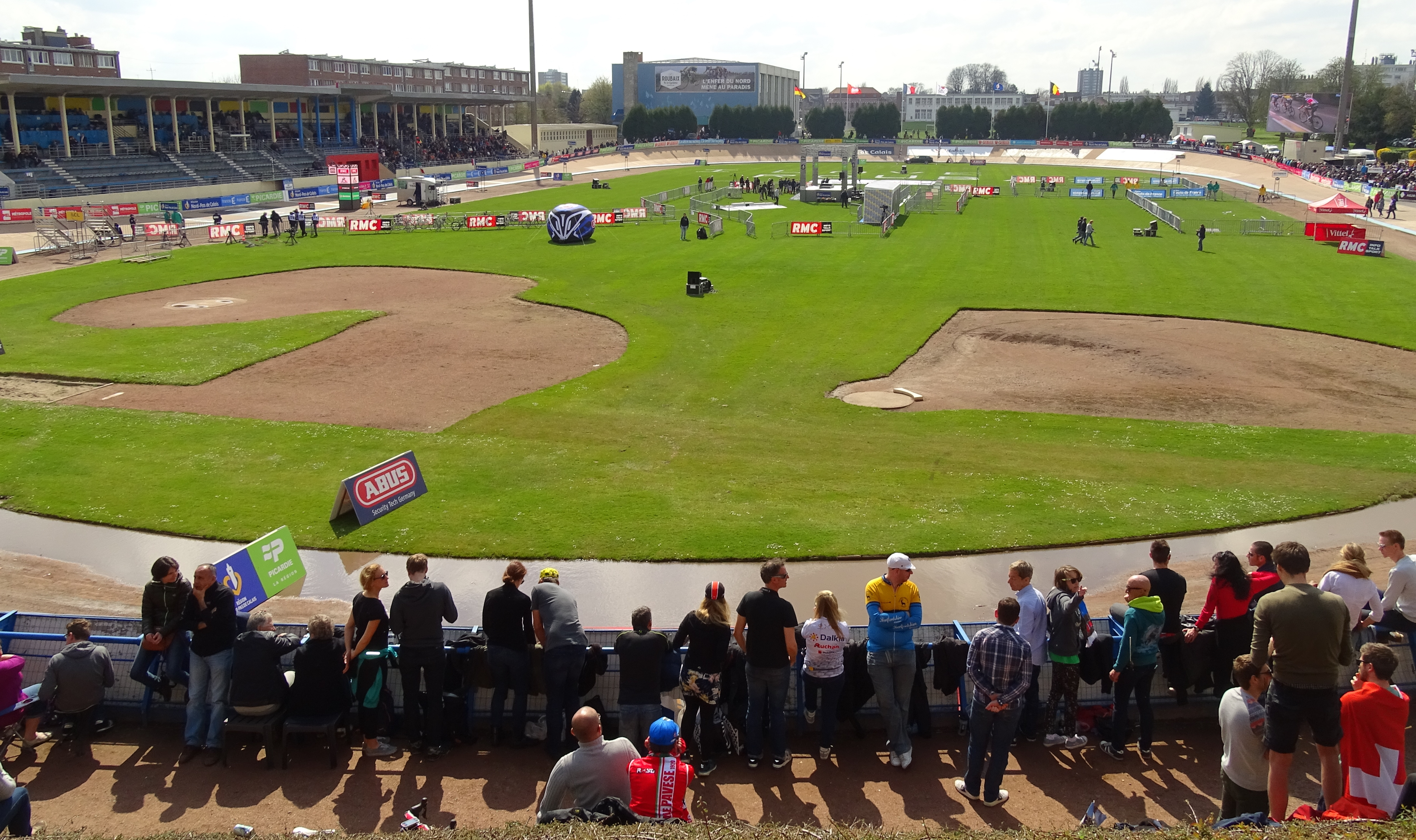
The Roubaix Velodrome, where the Paris–Roubaix finished, on the day of the race. The victory podium can be seen in the centre.

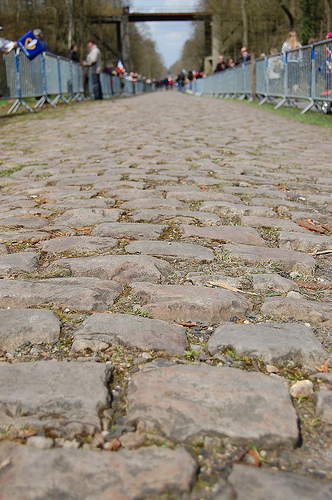
The cobbled road at the Trouée d'Arenberg

The route of the 2016 Paris–Roubaix was not significantly changed from the 2015 edition. It was slightly longer at 257.5 kilometres (160.0 mi). There were 27 sectors of cobbled roads: these included one addition to the route, the uphill Hameau du Buat sector. Several sections of cobbles, including the difficult one at Mons-en-Pévèle, had been renovated since 2015.

Despite its name, the race did not start in Paris: it started in Compiègne (80 kilometres (50 mi) to the north) and travelled generally north towards Roubaix. The main difficulty came from the 27 cobbled sectors, with a total distance of 52.8 kilometres (32.8 mi); the race organisers gave these sectors a difficulty rating with the three five-star sectors the most difficult and the one one-star sector the easiest. The first 98.5 kilometres (61.2 mi) were generally flat on normal roads, with the first sector coming between Troisvilles and Inchy. Over the following 60 kilometres (37 mi), there were another eight cobbled sectors, before the first five-star sector. This was the Trouée d'Arenberg (English: Arenberg Trench) and was 2.4 kilometres (1.5 mi) in length. The riders turned back on themselves several times around Wallers to take in several more sectors. With the route again heading north, the riders crossed several more cobbled sectors – all rated as either three-star or four-star in difficulty – on the way to the next five-star sector, a 3-kilometre (1.9 mi) road through Mons-en-Pévèle. At the end of this sector, there were 45 kilometres (28 mi) to the finish line.

After Mons-en-Pévèle, there were seven more cobbled sectors before the final five-star sector. This was the 2.4-kilometre (1.5 mi) Carrefour de l'Arbre; by the end there were 15 kilometres (9.3 mi) to the finish line. This included three more cobbled sectors – two two-star sectors and the final one-star sector as the route entered Roubaix itself. The route ended on the Roubaix Velodrome in Roubaix: the riders enter the velodrome half-way round; they ride one-and-a-half laps of the 500-metre (550 yd) circuit to complete the race.

=== Maps ===
Maps of the 2016 Paris–Roubaix route. Cobbled sectors are shown in green

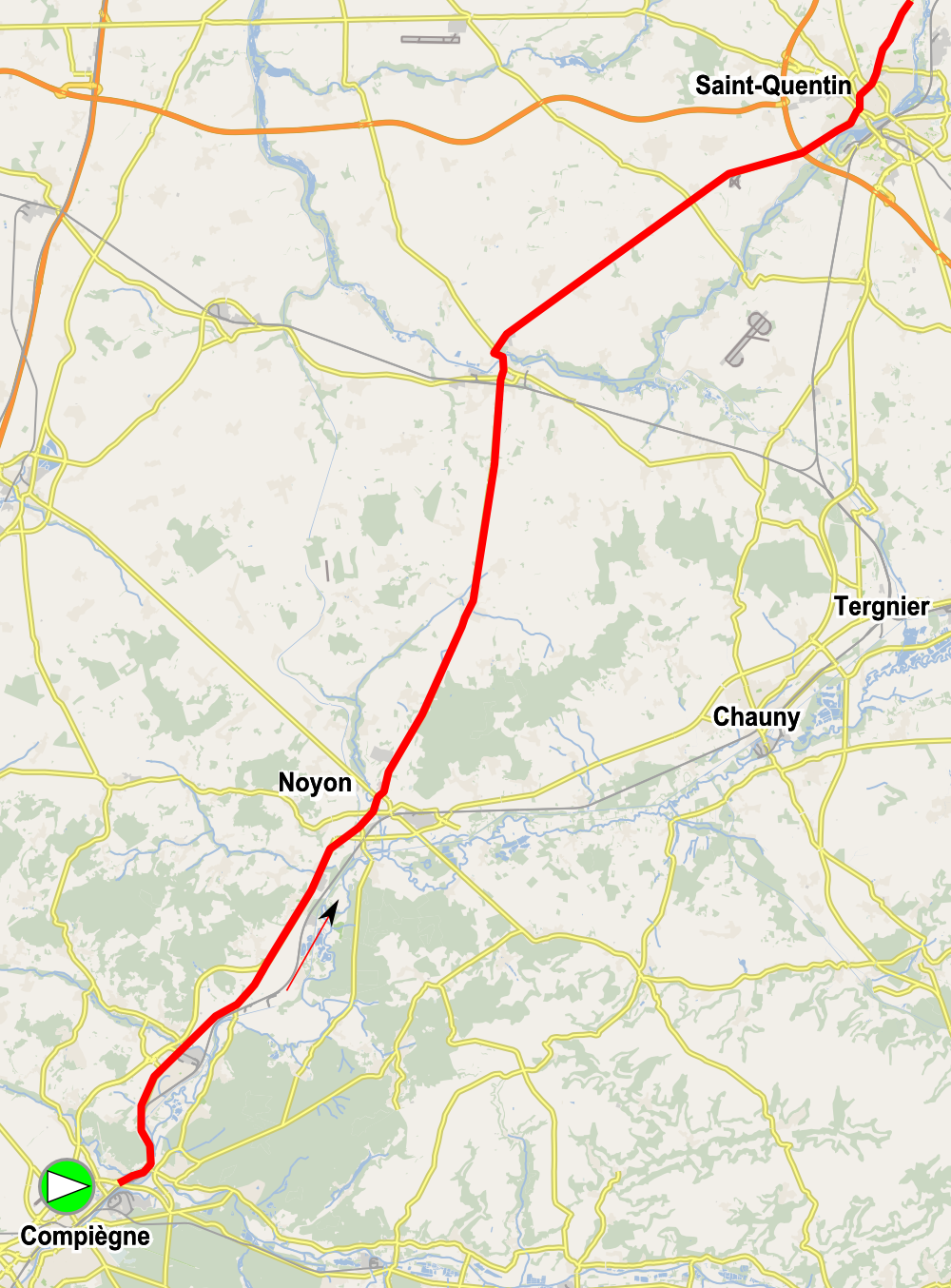
Route between Compiège and Saint-Quentin

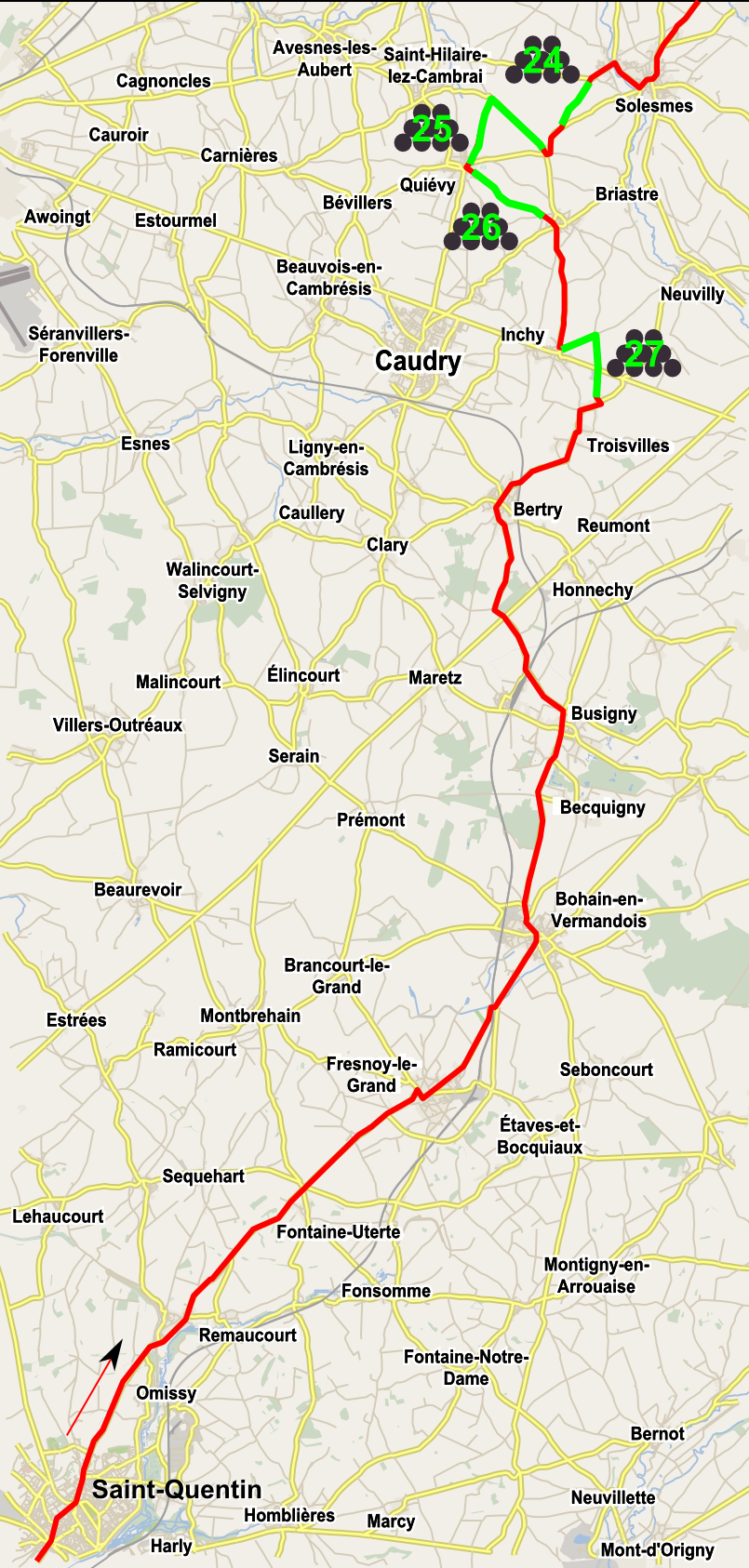
Route between Saint-Quentin and Solesmes

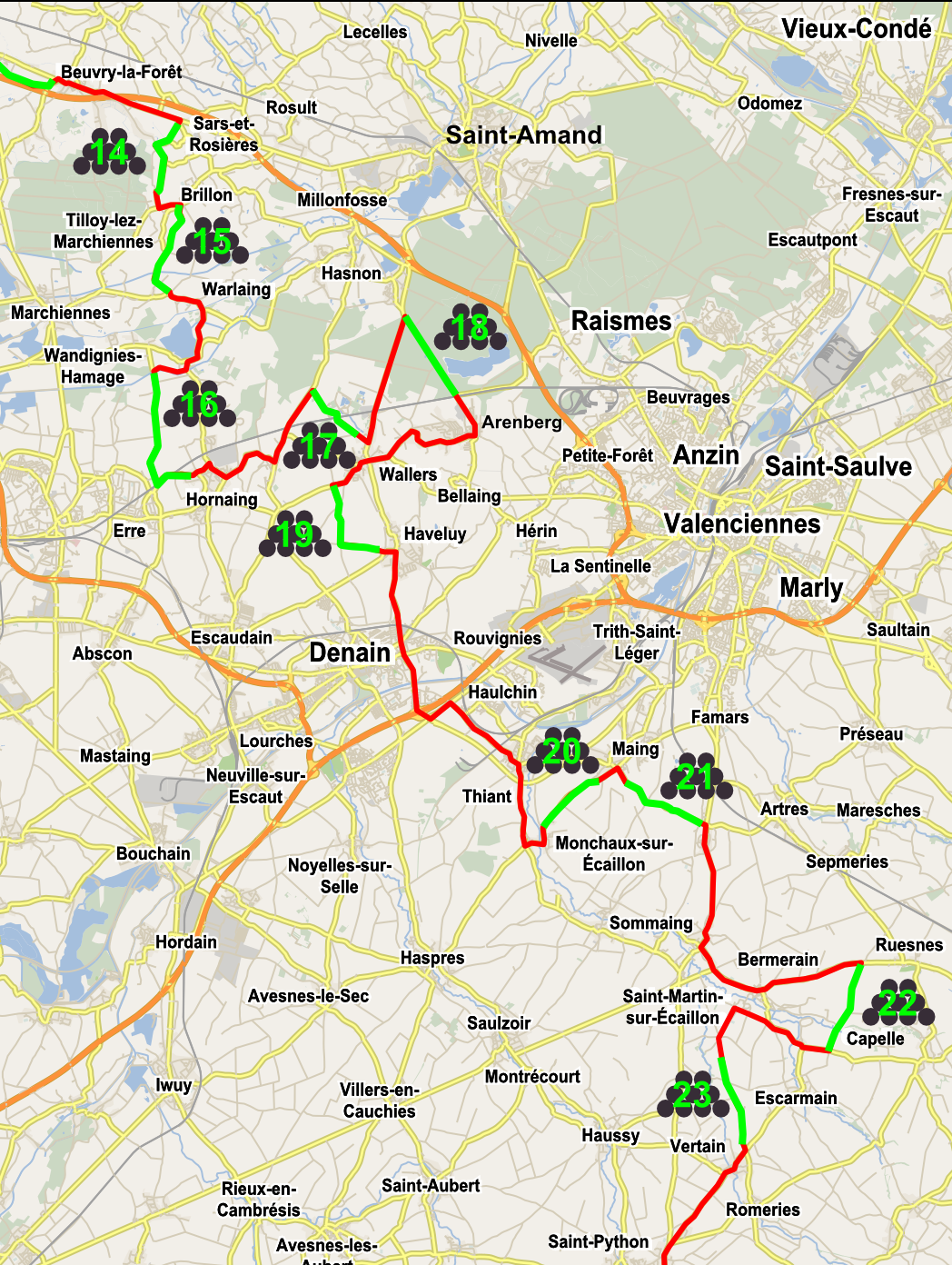
Route between Solesmes and Orchies

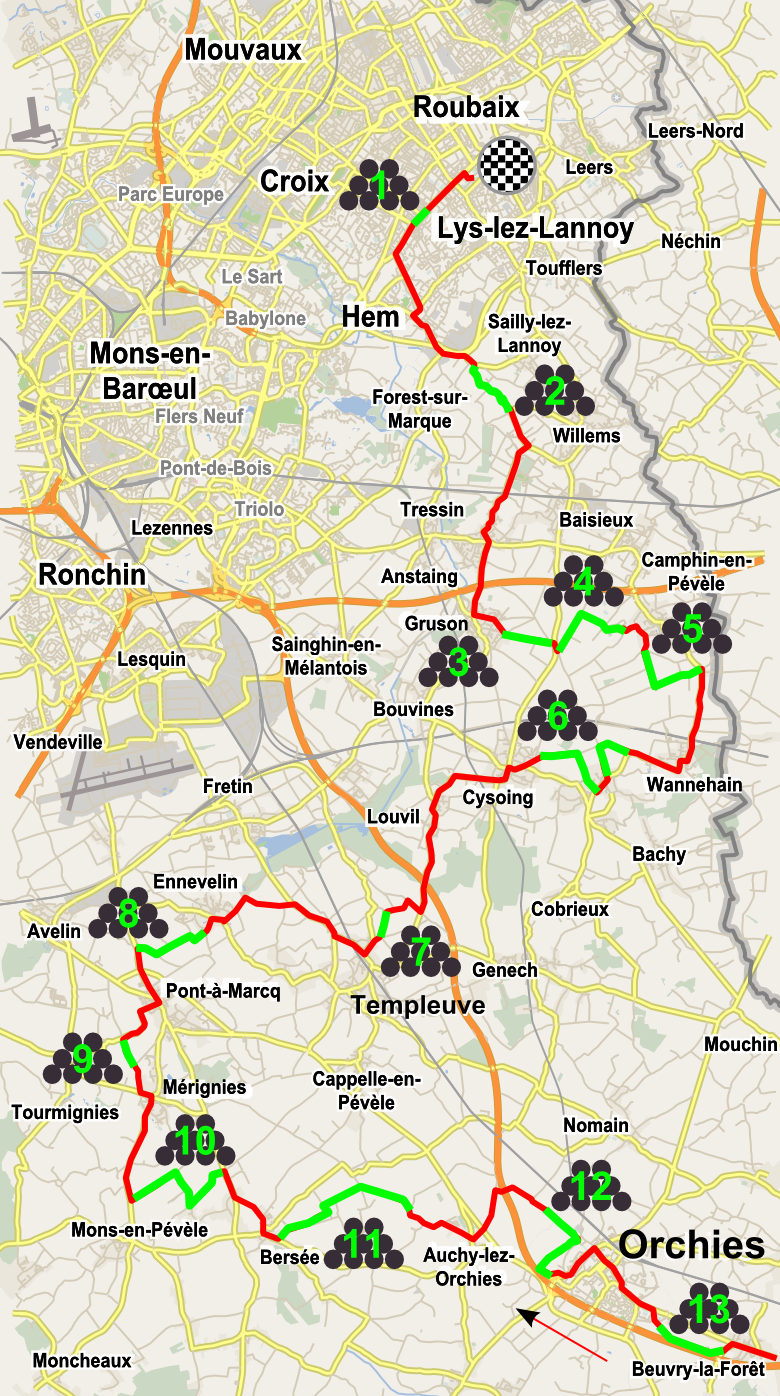
Route between Orchies and Roubaix

=== Cobbled sectors ===
Cobbled sectors of the 2016 Paris–Roubaix
Section number	Name	Distance from start (km)	Length (m)	Category
27	Troisvilles to Inchy	98.5	2200	*
26	Viesly to Quiévy	105	1800	*
25	Quiévy to Saint-Python	107.5	3700	*
24	Saint-Python	112.5	1500	*
23	Vertain to Saint-Martin-sur-Écaillon	120.5	2300	*
22	Capelle to Ruesnes (Hameau du Buat)	127	1700	*
21	Quérénaing to Maing	137.5	2500	*
20	Maing to Monchaux-sur-Écaillon	141	1600	*
19	Haveluy to Wallers	154	2500	*
18	Trouée d'Arenberg	162	2400	*
17	Wallers to Hélesmes	168	1600	*
16	Hornaing to Wandignies	175	3700	*
15	Warlaing to Brillon	182.5	2400	*
14	Tilloy to Sars-et-Rosières	186	2400	*
13	Beuvry-la-Forêt to Orchies	192.5	1400	*
12	Orchies	197.5	1700	*
11	Auchy-lez-Orchies to Bersée	203.5	2700	*
10	Mons-en-Pévèle	209	3000	*
9	Mérignies to Avelin	215	700	*
8	Pont-Thibaut to Ennevelin	218	1400	*
7	Templeuve (Moulin-de-Vertain)	224.5	500	*
6	Cysoing to Bourghelles	231	1300	*
6	Bourghelles to Wannehain	233.5	1100	*
5	Camphin-en-Pévèle	238	1800	*
4	Carrefour de l'Arbre	240.5	2100	*
3	Gruson	243	1100	*
2	Willems to Hem	249.5	1400	*
1	Roubaix, Espace Crupelandt	256.5	300	*
Total cobbled sections			52800	

== Teams ==
As Paris–Roubaix is a UCI World Tour event, all 18 UCI World Teams were invited automatically and were obliged to send a squad. In February 2016, the race organisers announced the seven UCI Professional Continental teams that had received wildcard invitations, completing the 25-team peloton. With each team allowed to enter up to eight riders, the maximum size of the peloton was 200. Astana was the only team to submit just seven riders. Team Katusha's Jacopo Guarnieri failed to start the race, so the race began with 198 riders.

UCI WorldTeams

- AG2R La Mondiale
- Astana
- BMC Racing Team
- Team Dimension Data
- Etixx–Quick-Step
- FDJ
- IAM Cycling
- Lampre–Merida
- Lotto–Soudal
- Movistar Team
- Team Giant–Alpecin
- Team Katusha
- LottoNL–Jumbo
- Team Sky
- Tinkoff
- Trek–Segafredo
- Cannondale
- Orica–GreenEDGE

UCI Professional Continental teams

- Bora–Argon 18
- Cofidis
- Delko–Marseille Provence KTM
- Direct Énergie
- Fortuneo–Vital Concept
- Topsport Vlaanderen–Baloise
- Wanty–Groupe Gobert

== Pre-race favourites ==
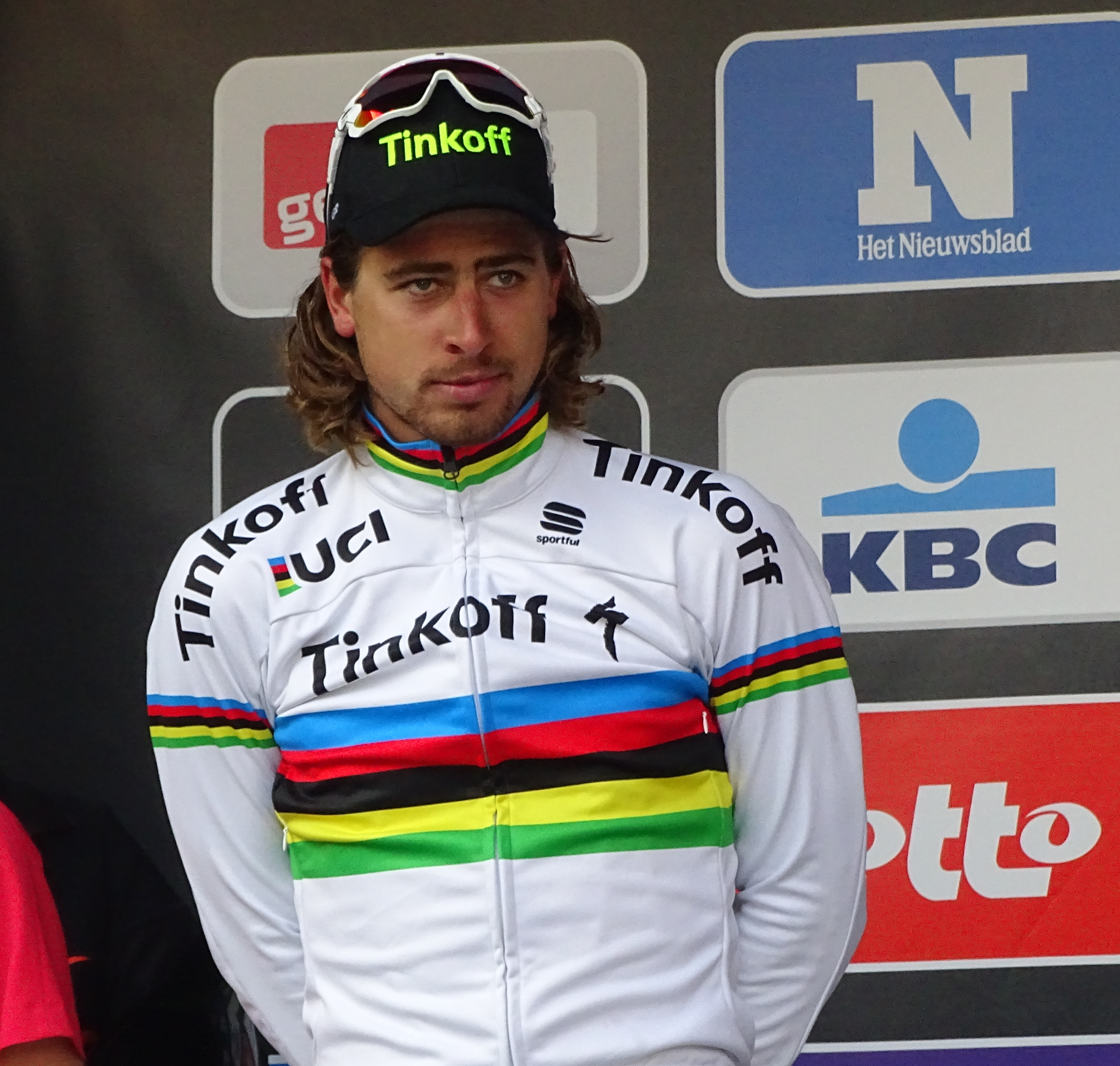
Peter Sagan (Tinkoff), the world champion and one of the favourites for the race victory (photographed at Omloop Het Nieuwsblad)

The recent editions of Paris–Roubaix had been won in various ways. Seven of the previous ten editions had been won by riders who had made solo breakaways; the most recent of these was Niki Terpstra in 2014. Other editions had been won in small group sprints: there were three riders together at the finish in 2008 Paris–Roubaix, two riders in 2013 and six in 2015.

John Degenkolb (Team Giant–Alpecin) won the sprint in 2015, but was unable to defend his title in the 2016 edition due to injuries sustained in a collision with a car during winter training. Greg Van Avermaet (BMC Racing Team), who finished third in 2015, was also unable to start the race after breaking his collarbone in a crash at the Tour of Flanders the previous week.

The two principal favourites to win the race were Peter Sagan (Tinkoff) and Fabian Cancellara (Trek–Segafredo). Sagan, the reigning world champion, had won the Tour of Flanders (the other monument raced on cobbled roads) in a solo breakaway. He was able to win both from a breakaway and in a group sprint. Sagan's best previous result in Paris–Roubaix was his sixth-place finish in 2014. Cancellara had won the race on three previous occasions (in 2006, 2010 and 2013) and had finished in the top ten on five other occasions. Cancellara was racing in his final Paris–Roubaix, after announcing that he would retire at the end of the 2016 season.

One of Cancellara's main rivals in classics races over his career was Tom Boonen (Etixx–Quick-Step), who had won Paris–Roubaix on four occasions in the past. He had not been in strong form, however, in the 2016 season and had struggled with a wrist injury in the Tour of Flanders. His team, however, was very strong, with Terpstra, Stijn Vandenbergh and Zdeněk Štybar all possible winners of the race.

Other possible winners included Sep Vanmarcke (LottoNL–Jumbo), who was third in the Tour of Flanders, Alexander Kristoff (Team Katusha), Lars Boom (Astana), Ian Stannard (Team Sky) and Edvald Boasson Hagen (Team Dimension Data).

== Race summary ==
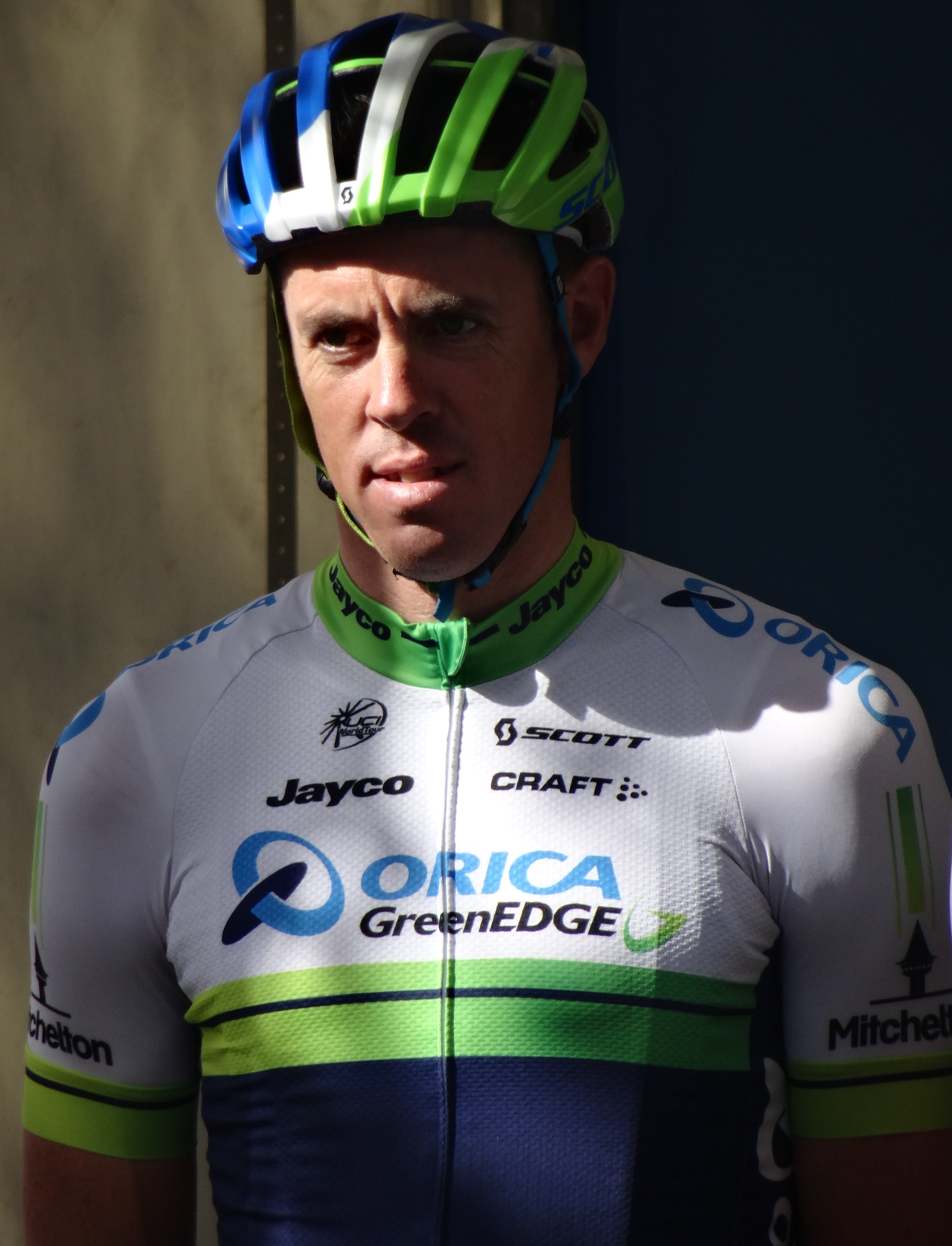
Mathew Hayman (Orica–GreenEDGE), who was in the day's main breakaway and went on to win the race in the final sprint (photographed in 2014)

There was a high-speed start to the race, with several groups attempting to form breakaways; each was chased by the main peloton. An initial group of six riders was caught within 20 kilometres (12 mi) of the start; a group of 25 then briefly held a 30-second lead before they were recaptured by the peloton. After several more attacks and a total of 67 kilometres (42 mi), the riders were still all together in one group. A group of sixteen riders then attacked and built a lead, despite the efforts of the Etixx–Quick-Step and Bora–Argon 18 teams to chase it. As the riders arrived on the first cobbled sectors, Sky took over at the front of the peloton to protect their riders and the breakaway's advantage increased to two minutes, although it was reduced to fourteen riders. The riders in the breakaway were Sylvain Chavanel (Direct Énergie), Mathew Hayman and Magnus Cort (Orica–GreenEDGE), Jelle Wallays (Lotto–Soudal), Yaroslav Popovych (Trek–Segafredo), Johan Le Bon (FDJ), Marko Kump (Lampre–Merida), Tim Declercq (Topsport Vlaanderen–Baloise), Salvatore Puccio (Sky), Reinardt Janse van Rensburg (Dimension Data), Frederik Backaert (Wanty–Groupe Gobert), Maxime Daniel (AG2R La Mondiale), Borut Božič (Cofidis) and Imanol Erviti (Movistar Team). The breakaway was notable for the presence of Popovych, who had announced that the race would be the last of his career, and Erviti, who had finished in the top ten at the Tour of Flanders a week earlier having again been in the early breakaway.

With 140 kilometres (87 mi) completed and more than 115 kilometres (71 mi) remaining, there was a crash in the peloton before the eighth cobbled sector. Etixx–Quick-Step immediately sent Tony Martin and Guillaume Van Keirsbulck to the front of the group and accelerated hard; this caused the group to split up. The front group included Boonen, Boasson Hagen, Stannard, Rowe and Vanmarcke along with several others, with Sagan, Cancellara, Štybar and Terpstra all in a chasing group. LottoNL–Jumbo had six riders in the front group. The gap between the first and second chasing groups quickly grew to a minute, thanks in particular to Martin's work; he spent around 40 kilometres (25 mi) at the front of Boonen's group. Martin's effort reduced the group to five riders, with Vanmarcke and Rowe among the riders dropped. As they reached the Trouée d'Arenberg, the break had just over a minute's lead over the first chasing group; the Vanmarcke group was around 20 seconds behind them, with Cancellara and Sagan in another group that was around a minute further back. Sagan himself was making efforts at the front of the group to try to bring the first chase group back.

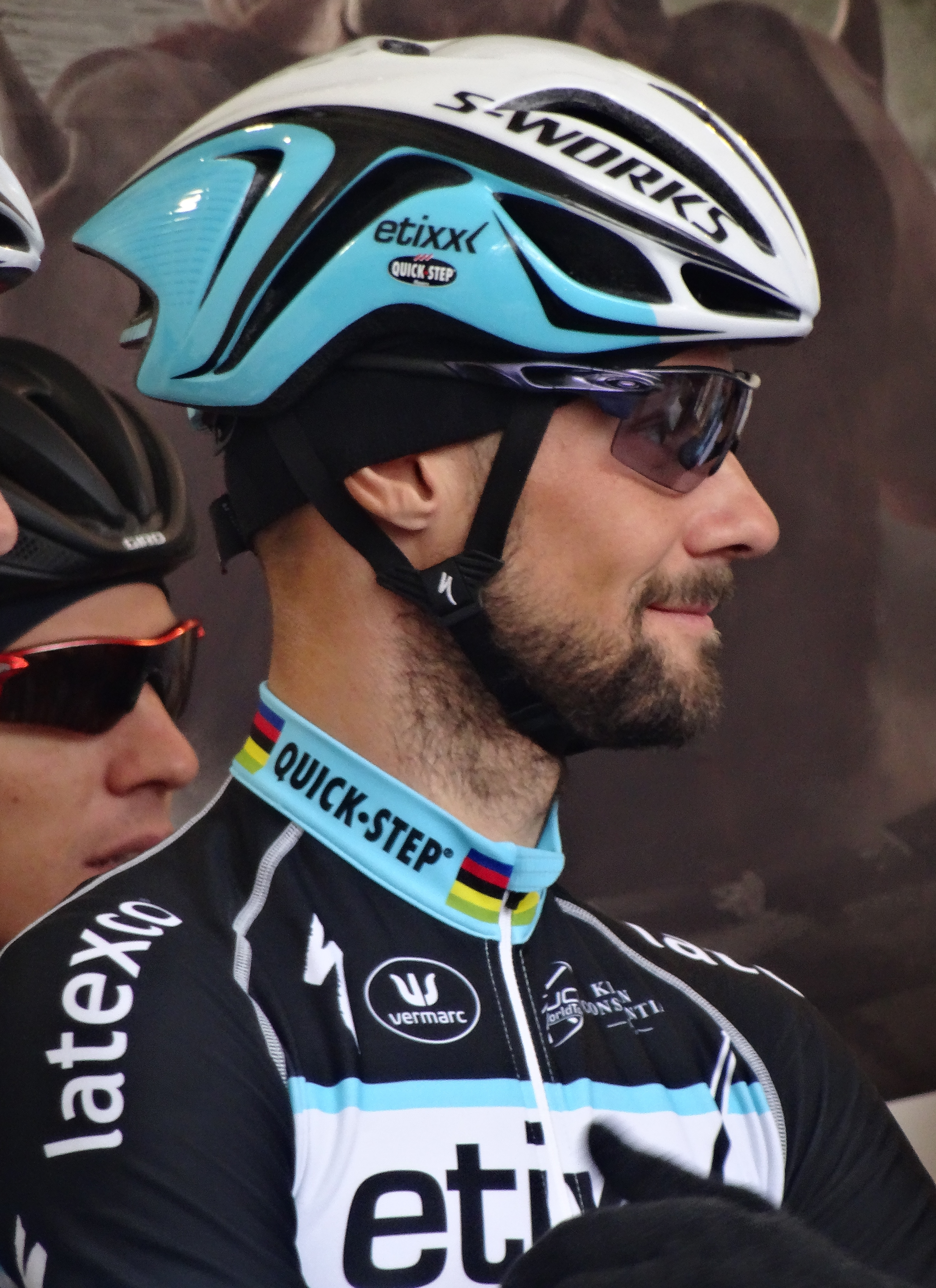
Tom Boonen (Etixx–Quick-Step), who had won the race on four previous occasions, finished second in the sprint after attacking several times (photographed in 2015).

With 87 kilometres (54 mi) remaining, Vanmarcke's group merged with Boonen's, forming a 16-man group that was 55 seconds behind the breakaway group. Alexander Kristoff had punctured and been dropped from the group containing Cancellara and Sagan. Over the following kilometres, Hayman attacked solo from the breakaway; meanwhile, Jasper Stuyven (Trek–Segafredo) rode hard to bring his teammate Cancellara back to within 40 seconds of the first chasing group. Hayman was brought back by the rest of the group, while Popovych dropped back from the breakaway to help Cancellara's group with 64 kilometres (40 mi) remaining. After the next cobbled sector, Boonen's group caught the remainder of the breakaway and formed a group of around 20 riders, led by Team Sky, that was around 50 seconds ahead of the Cancellara group.

Cancellara and Sagan worked hard together at the front of what was now the second group on the road. Shortly afterwards, the front group was disrupted when three of the four Team Sky riders in the front group – Rowe, Puccio and Gianni Moscon – crashed in just a few corners, leaving Stannard as the team's only rider in the leading group. With 48 kilometres (30 mi) remaining and the chasers 37 seconds behind the lead group, the riders crossed the five-star Mons-en-Pévèle cobbles. Cancellara crashed on a muddy section, slipping off the crown of the road. Sagan, riding immediately behind him, managed to bunny hop over him – with only one foot clipped into his bike – and continued in pursuit of the lead group; Cancellara, although able to continue the race, never rejoined the group. Terpstra was also among those to crash in the incident. Cycling Weekly described Sagan's manoeuvre as "unbelievable bike handling".

Rowe rejoined the leading group with Heinrich Haussler and Aleksejs Saramotins (both IAM Cycling) to form a ten-man leading group which led Sagan's group by over a minute with 30 kilometres (19 mi) remaining. Rowe was tired after coming back from his crash; he agreed to work fully for Stannard. He put in a strong effort with 20 kilometres (12 mi) remaining that dropped Erviti, Haussler, Saramotins and Marcel Sieberg (Lotto–Soudal), who formed a chase group behind. A five-man group then formed on the Camphin-en-Pévèle sector, with Stannard, Boonen, Boasson Hagen, Hayman and Vanmarcke the only riders remaining. Vanmarcke put in a big attack on the Carrefour de l'Arbre; although he briefly had a significant gap, the other four riders brought him back before the next section of cobbles.

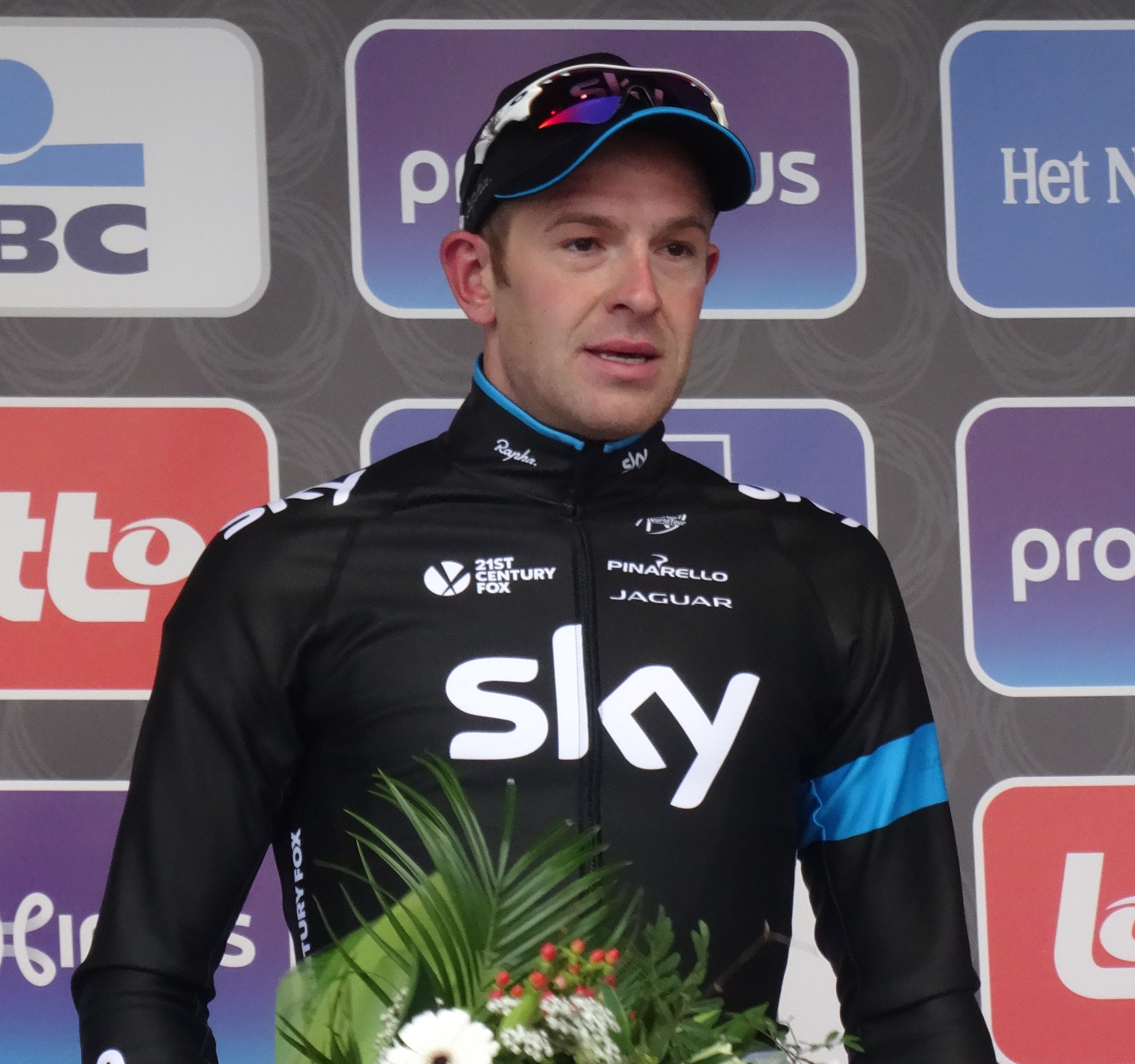
Ian Stannard (Team Sky), who finished third in the sprint (photographed in 2015)

Stannard attacked with 6 kilometres (3.7 mi) remaining. He had a 20 metres (20 yd) advantage, but the group was able to come back to him. In the final 3 kilometres (1.9 mi), Boonen attacked several times. On the last of these attacks, Hayman accelerated past him and the two riders came together into the velodrome, with Vanmarcke joining soon afterwards. With one 500-metre (550 yd) lap remaining, Stannard and Boasson Hagen rejoined the group. Hayman led out the sprint: Boonen was on his wheel and Stannard came around the outside. Neither was able to come around him and Hayman crossed the line first to take the victory. Boonen was second with Stannard third. Vanmarcke finished with them in fourth place; Boasson Hagen was three seconds behind in fifth place.

The chase group of Haussler, Sieberg and Saramotins finished a minute back, with Erviti a further seven seconds back to finish in ninth. Sagan's group arrived more than two minutes after Hayman, with Adrien Petit (Direct Energie) outsprinting Sagan for tenth place.

== Result ==
Result (top 10)
Rank	Rider	Team	Time
1	Mathew Hayman (AUS)	Orica–GreenEDGE	5h 51' 53"
2	Tom Boonen (BEL)	Etixx–Quick-Step	+ 0"
3	Ian Stannard (GBR)	Team Sky	+ 0"
4	Sep Vanmarcke (BEL)	LottoNL–Jumbo	+ 0"
5	Edvald Boasson Hagen (NOR)	Team Dimension Data	+ 3"
6	Heinrich Haussler (AUS)	IAM Cycling	+ 1' 00"
7	Marcel Sieberg (GER)	Lotto–Soudal	+ 1' 00"
8	Aleksejs Saramotins (LAT)	IAM Cycling	+ 1' 00"
9	Imanol Erviti (ESP)	Movistar Team	+ 1' 07"
10	Adrien Petit (FRA)	Direct Énergie	+ 2' 20"

== Post-race analysis ==
=== Reactions ===
The race was given widespread praise. Bernard Hinault, who won the race in 1981, described it as "magnificent". He particularly praised Etixx–Quick-Step's aggression a long way from the finish, describing it as the kind of move that used to exist but had not been seen in a long time. Similarly, Marc Madiot (the manager of the FDJ team and the winner of the race in 1985 and 1991) described it as "a beautiful race, of great quality" and praised Hayman as "a fine winner". VeloNews described it as an "epic battle" and as "one-day racing at its absolute best". The cycling journalist and former cyclist Daniel Lloyd tweeted that it had been "one of the best races I've ever seen"; David Millar, another former cyclist, wrote "That was exhausting" after watching the race.

Mathew Hayman described his reaction as "disbelief". He had broken his arm in a crash at the Omloop Het Nieuwsblad at the beginning of the classics season and had barely raced before the race began. He said that he had realised that the other riders were not superior to him after they failed to get away from him in the closing kilometres. He stated that he could "gamble" and that it had paid off. Hayman's team manager, Shayne Bannan, described him as "so professional" and suggested that he had been helped by good preparation and motivation combined with a lack of expectation; he called it "an incredible ride".

Boonen praised Hayman's victory. He said that Hayman was "the rider nobody was really looking at" and that he had ridden a "good sprint", although no one had much energy left by the velodrome; Vanmarcke had faded in the final metres and boxed Boonen in at the bottom of the track. He stated that he had received a text message on the morning of the race from a doctor who had treated him after he fractured his skull in the 2015 Abu Dhabi Tour; the doctor had said that the day of the race would be the first day that Boonen would be able to get back on his bike. He noted that he "couldn't be unsatisfied" even though he had not won the race. Stannard described the race as "so close yet so far" and thought that he could have managed a better result than his third place had he not attacked in the final kilometres. He said that he was "super happy" to see Hayman win; he also said that there were "two more steps to work my way up now".

Fabian Cancellara finished his final Paris–Roubaix in 40th place, seven minutes behind Hayman. He said "I’m not sad, I’m happy not to be in hospital. I’m happy to have finished", and that he was hurting all over – as well as crashing during the race, he had crashed in the velodrome – but said that he was "happy it is done". Sagan described the race as "a crazy day"; he said that he was lucky not to have crashed with Cancellara, but that his race was over at that point. He described Paris–Roubaix as "very hard to win".

=== UCI World Tour standings ===
In the 2016 UCI World Tour season-long competition, the top 10 of the standings remained relatively unchanged after the race. Sagan was still on top, 49 points ahead of Alberto Contador. Vanmarcke moved up from eighth to fifth, while Stannard moved into tenth place. Tinkoff remained ahead of Team Sky in the team rankings; in the nations' rankings, Australia moved back into the lead, with Belgium moving into second and pushing Spain into third.

UCI World Tour standings on 10 April 2016
Rank	Rider	Team	Points
1	Peter Sagan (SVK)	Tinkoff	329
2	Alberto Contador (ESP)	Tinkoff	280
3	Richie Porte (AUS)	BMC Racing Team	222
4	Sergio Henao (COL)	Team Sky	204
5	Sep Vanmarcke (BEL)	LottoNL–Jumbo	201
6	Nairo Quintana (COL)	Movistar Team	178
7	Fabian Cancellara (SUI)	Trek–Segafredo	166
8	Greg Van Avermaet (BEL)	BMC Racing Team	162
9	Arnaud Démare (FRA)	FDJ	137
10	Ian Stannard (GBR)	Team Sky	120
