= 2021 Paris–Roubaix Femmes =

Cycling race

2021 Paris-Roubaix Femmes
2021 UCI Women's World Tour, race 16 of 18
- Official event poster

Race details
- Dates: 2 October 2021
- Stages: 1
- Distance: 115.6 km (71.8 mi)
- Winning time: 2h 56' 07"

Results
	Winner	Lizzie Deignan (GBR)	(Trek–Segafredo)
	Second	Marianne Vos (NED)	(Team Jumbo–Visma)
	Third	Elisa Longo Borghini (ITA)	(Trek–Segafredo)

The 2021 Paris–Roubaix Femmes was a French road cycling one-day race that took place on 2 October 2021. It was the first edition of Paris–Roubaix Femmes and the 16th event of the 2021 UCI Women's World Tour.

The race was won by Lizzie Deignan of Great Britain, who attacked solo at the beginning of the first cobbled section, with more than two thirds of the course remaining. The winning move went so early, live pictures had not yet begun to be broadcast. Already an historic event as the inaugural women's Roubaix, Deignan's solo victory was later described by commentators as one of the greatest Roubaix rides, male or female, of all time. With the victory, Deignan became the first rider to win all three women's monuments that existed at the time – Paris-Roubaix Femmes, Women's Tour of Flanders and Liège–Bastogne–Liège Femmes.

== Route ==
The first women's edition of Paris–Roubaix Femmes started in Denain and finished on the velodrome in Roubaix covering 115.6 kilometres (71.8 mi). It featured 29.2 kilometres (18.1 mi) of cobblestones, spread out over 17 sectors – including the famed Carrefour de l'Arbre and the Mons-en-Pévèle – both ranked at "five stars" in difficulty. The women covered the same final 17 sectors as the men's race.

Media noted that the shorter distance meant that a much higher proportion of the race would be on pavé – just over 25 per cent, compared to around 20 per cent in the men's race.

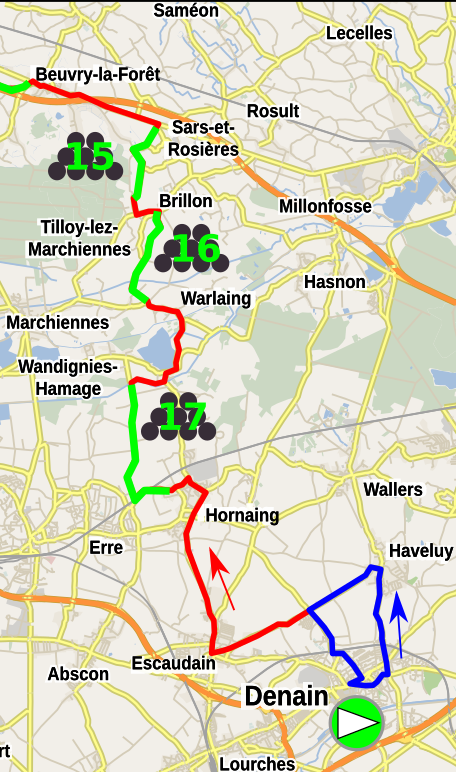
Start in Denain, before heading north

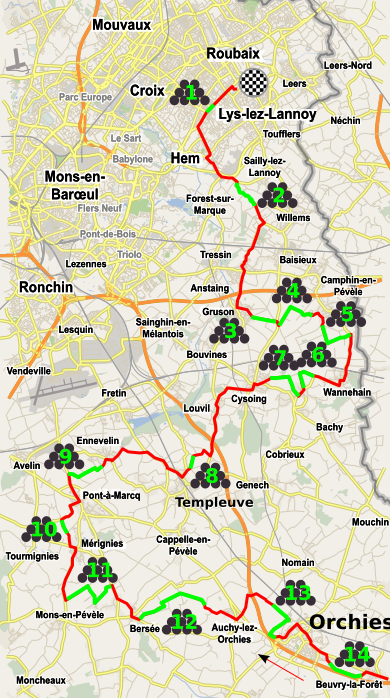
Route from Orchies to finish in Roubaix

=== Cobbled sections ===
Cobbled sectors in Paris-Roubaix Femmes
No.	Name	Distance from		Length (km)	Difficulty
No.	Name	Start (km)	Finish (km)	Length (km)	Difficulty
17	Hornaing to Wandignies			3.7	****
16	Warlaing to Brillon			2.4	***
15	Tilloy to Sars-et-Rosières			2.4	****
14	Beuvry to Orchies			1.4	***
13	Orchies			1.7	***
12	Auchy to Bersée			2.7	****
11	Mons-en-Pévèle			3.0	*****
10	Mérignies to Avelin			0.7	**
9	Pont-Thibault to Ennevelin			1.4	***
8	Templeuve - L’Épinette			0.2	*
7	Cysoing to Bourghelles			1.3	***
6	Bourghelles to Wannehain			1.1	***
5	Camphin-en-Pévèle			1.8	****
4	Carrefour de l'Arbre			2.1	*****
3	Gruson			1.1	**
2	Willems to Hem			1.4	***
1	Roubaix			0.3	*

== Teams ==
All nine UCI Women's WorldTeams and 13 UCI Women's Continental Teams made up the 22 teams that participated in the race. Alé BTC Ljubljana, Bepink, and Team BikeExchange were the only teams to not enter a full squad of six riders; these three teams each entered five riders. Of the 129 riders to start the race, 61 riders finished while a further 44 riders finished outside of the time limit (8 percent after the winning time, or + 14' 05").

UCI Women's WorldTeams

- Alé BTC Ljubljana
- Canyon//SRAM
- FDJ Nouvelle-Aquitaine Futuroscope
- Liv Racing
- Movistar Team
- SD Worx
- Team BikeExchange
- Team DSM
- Trek–Segafredo

UCI Women's Continental Teams

- Arkéa Pro Cycling Team
- Bepink
- Ceratizit–WNT Pro Cycling
- Doltcini–Van Eyck–Proximus
- Drops–Le Col
- Lotto–Soudal Ladies
- NXTG Racing
- Parkhotel Valkenburg
- Stade Rochelais Charente-Maritime
- Team Coop–Hitec Products
- Team Jumbo–Visma
- Tibco–Silicon Valley Bank
- Valcar–Travel & Service

== Race summary ==
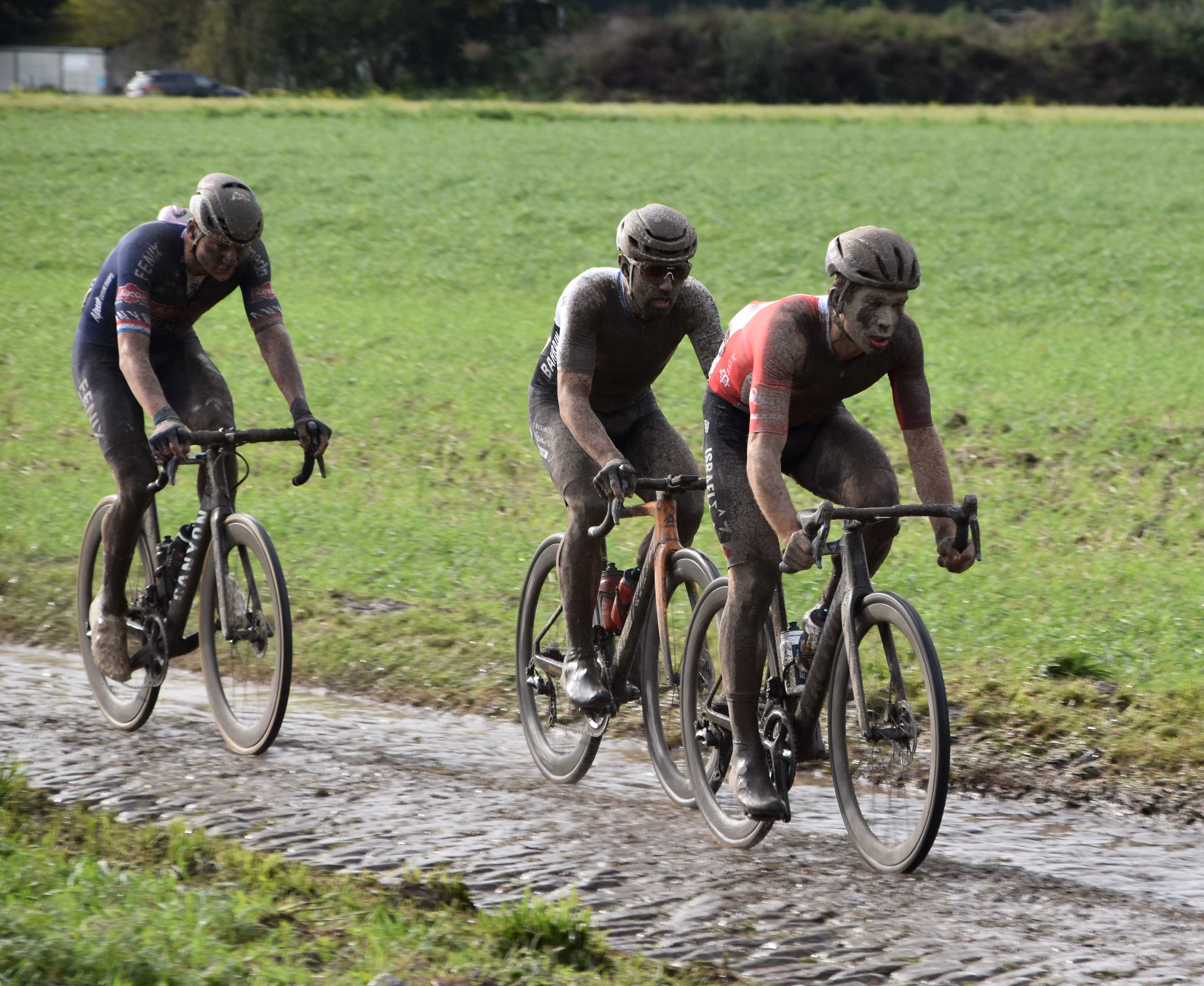
The race was held in wet and rainy conditions – as shown here in the men's race

The first edition of Paris–Roubaix Femmes was held in October 2021, having been postponed from its original April date due to a French COVID-19 lockdown. The 2020 edition had been scheduled for 25 October 2020, but was cancelled due to the COVID-19 pandemic.

The race was much anticipated by the media, noting that the race posed a new challenge for the women's peloton and "a unique spectacle". Contenders tipped for victory included Jolien D'Hoore, Chantal van den Broek-Blaak, Ellen van Dijk, as well as riders with cyclo-cross experience such as Marianne Vos and Christine Majerus.

The Paris–Roubaix weekend was wet and rainy, for the first time for nearly 20 years. Attacking at the first pavé section at Hornaing, Lizzie Deignan (Trek–Segafredo) went clear, prior to live television pictures being broadcast. Deignan then soloed for the last 80 kilometres (50 mi) of the race as the peloton splintered behind her, building a lead of 2 minutes 40 seconds across all 17 pavé sections, before entering the Roubaix Velodrome alone. Deignan therefore won the inaugural edition of Paris–Roubaix Femmes by over a minute in front of Vos (Team Jumbo-Visma). Deignan's teammate Elisa Longo Borghini held off a fast closing Lisa Brennauer (Ceratizit-WNT Pro Cycling) for third place, completing the first podium of Paris–Roubaix Femmes.

Deignan's attack and solo victory was described by commentators as one of the greatest Roubaix rides of all time. With the victory, Deignan became the first rider to win all three women's monuments – Paris–Roubaix Femmes, Women's Tour of Flanders and Liège–Bastogne–Liège Femmes. Following the race, Eurosport described it as an "instant classic".

== Result ==
Result
Rank	Rider	Team	Time
1	Lizzie Deignan (GBR)	Trek–Segafredo	2h 56' 07"
2	Marianne Vos (NED)	Team Jumbo–Visma	+ 1' 17"
3	Elisa Longo Borghini (ITA)	Trek–Segafredo	+ 1' 47"
4	Lisa Brennauer (GER)	Ceratizit–WNT Pro Cycling	+ 1' 51"
5	Marta Bastianelli (ITA)	Alé BTC Ljubljana	+ 2' 10"
6	Emma Norsgaard Jørgensen (DEN)	Movistar Team	+ 2' 10"
7	Franziska Koch (GER)	Team DSM	+ 2' 10"
8	Audrey Cordon-Ragot (FRA)	Trek–Segafredo	+ 2' 10"
9	Marta Cavalli (ITA)	FDJ Nouvelle-Aquitaine Futuroscope	+ 2' 10"
10	Chantal van den Broek-Blaak (NED)	SD Worx	+ 2' 10"
