= Paris–Roubaix Femmes =

French one-day women's cycling race

Race details
- Date: Early April
- Region: Northern France
- Nicknames: The Hell of the North; Queen of the Classics; L'enfer du Nord
- Discipline: Road
- Competition: UCI Women's World Tour
- Type: One-day
- Organiser: Amaury Sport Organisation
- Race director: Jean-François Pescheux
- Web site: www.paris-roubaix-femmes.fr

History
- First edition: 2021
- Editions: 6 (as of 2026)
- First winner: Lizzie Deignan (GBR)
- Most wins: No repeat winners
- Most recent: Franziska Koch (GER)

Paris–Roubaix Femmes is a one day women's bicycle race on cobbled roads (or pavé) in northern France, held annually in early April. It is part of the UCI Women's World Tour. The equivalent men's race is a cycling monument, and after the Milan–San Remo Women, Tour of Flanders and Liège–Bastogne–Liège, the fourth to stage a women's edition.

== History ==
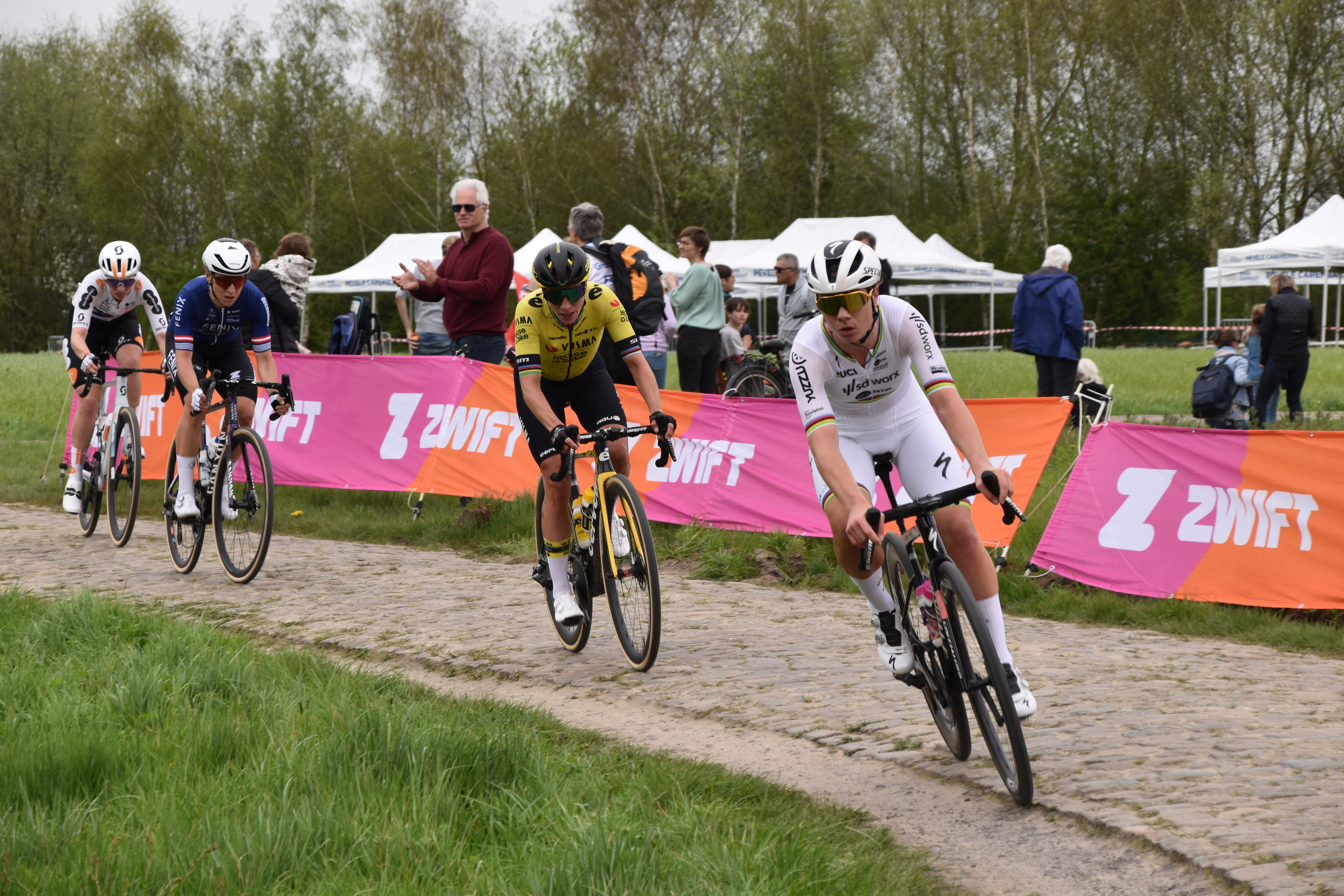
Riders tackling the cobbles

Paris–Roubaix is one of cycling's oldest races, and was first held in 1896. Paris–Roubaix is famous for rough terrain, mud and cobblestones, or pavé (setts) (Note: Paris–Roubaix is popularly known throughout the English-speaking world for its 'cobbled sectors', but this is a misnomer as the sectors are actually paved with granite setts, roughly hewn blocks, which are smoother and safer than true cobblestones (prominent rounded pebbles often used on inner city streets). This article maintains the misnomer 'Cobblestones' but attempts to clarify the misnomer where relevant.) – the race has been nicknamed l'enfer du Nord, or Hell of the North. Punctures and other mechanical problems are common and often influence the result.

In the early 2000s, French cyclist Marion Clignet recalled asking if the organisers of Paris–Roubaix would organise a women's edition of the race, with Jean-Marie Leblanc (who worked for the organisers) replying that they would not. In the late 2010s, the women's peloton pushed again for the race, with Iris Slappendel stating that "we would love to have a Paris–Roubaix". In 2018, Union Cycliste Internationale (UCI) president David Lappartient pushed for the race, stating "I dream of a Paris–Roubaix Feminine" in an interview with L'Équipe.

The announcement of the inaugural women's edition of Paris–Roubaix came as a surprise addition to the revised 2020 UCI Women's World Tour calendar. Riders noted their anticipation for the event, with Audrey Cordon-Ragot calling it "the race that every classics rider wants to win in her life". UCI president Lappartient welcomed the announcement, stating "we believe that Paris–Roubaix is one of the greatest classics in the world, and for me, there is no reason not to have a Paris–Roubaix [for women]". The race was scheduled for 25 October 2020, but was cancelled due to the COVID-19 pandemic.

The first edition of Paris–Roubaix Femmes took place in October 2021, with Lizzie Deignan winning following an 80 kilometres solo attack described by commentators as one of the greatest Roubaix rides of all time. Following the race, Eurosport described it as an "instant classic".

Prior to the 2022 race, organisers announced that the race would be sponsored by Zwift for the next 4 years, and that the prize money for the winner would be substantially increased from €1,535 to €20,000, following criticism of the disparity between the men's and women's races. The 2022 edition was won by Elisa Longo Borghini after a solo break with around 30 kilometres remaining, Alison Jackson won the 2023 edition from a small breakaway, and the 2024 edition was won by Lotte Kopecky from a small group sprint. In 2025, Pauline Ferrand-Prévot won after a solo attack with 25 kilometres remaining – the first French win at Paris–Roubaix since 1997.

The first five editions of the race were held on a Saturday, with the men's race the day after. From 2026, the race has been held on the same day. The move was primarily a cost cutting one, as Zwift dropped sponsorship of Paris-Roubaix Femmes to focus on the Tour de France Femmes, of which it is also a major backer. Reactions to the change were mixed-to-favorable, as TV air time was cut short due to overlap with the men's race, while viewership and fan attendance were expected to benefit from the joint scheduling.

From 2026, the UCI will award more ranking points to Grand Tours and cycling monuments compared to other races in the UCI Women's World Tour – thereby officially designating the race as a cycling monument. In early 2026, organisers announced that both the men's and women's races would be sponsored by the Hauts-de-France region, taking the name as a subtitle.

== Course ==
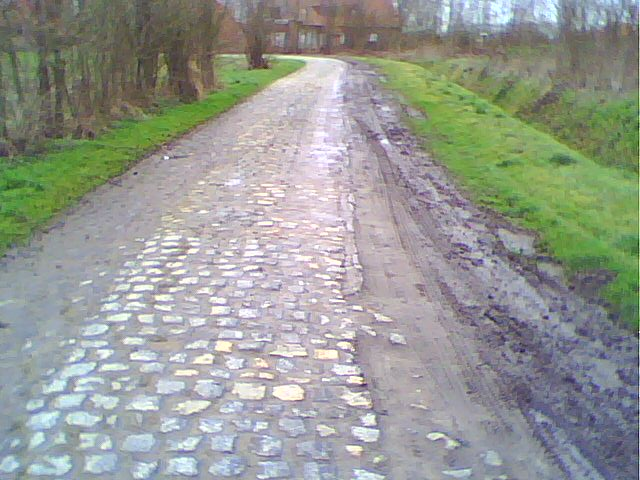
Carrefour de l'Arbre sector of pavé

The Paris–Roubaix Femmes course uses the same roads and cobbled sectors as the men's race – albeit over a shorter distance (around 145 kilometres (90 mi)) – before finishing in the Roubaix Velodrome. Editions of the race have so far started in Denain, with 17 to 20 sectors of pavé totalling around 30 kilometres (19 mi) in length. These pavé sectors include the famed Carrefour de l'Arbre and the Mons-en-Pévèle – both ranked at "five stars" in difficulty. The course is maintained by Les Amis de Paris–Roubaix, a group of fans of the race formed in 1983. The forçats du pavé seek to keep the course safe for riders while maintaining its difficulty.

As with the men's edition, the challenging course means that crashes and mechanical problems are common, with several riders suffering injuries – Annemiek van Vleuten broke her pubic bone in a crash during the inaugural edition of the race, Sanne Cant required facial stitches after a crash during the 2023 race and Sigrid Haugset rode around 60 kilometres (37 mi) to the finish with a fractured hip after a crash in the 2025 race. Cycling News noted in 2021 that "luck is always a factor at Paris–Roubaix [...] the rider who wins must have some good luck on her side to avoid the almost inevitable mechanicals and crashes across the pavè."

Organisers noted they consider it "too dangerous" to include the five star cobbled sector Trouée d'Arenberg due to its proximity to the start in Denain, but they also noted that they "do not rule out that we will pass through ... in the future".

== Winners ==
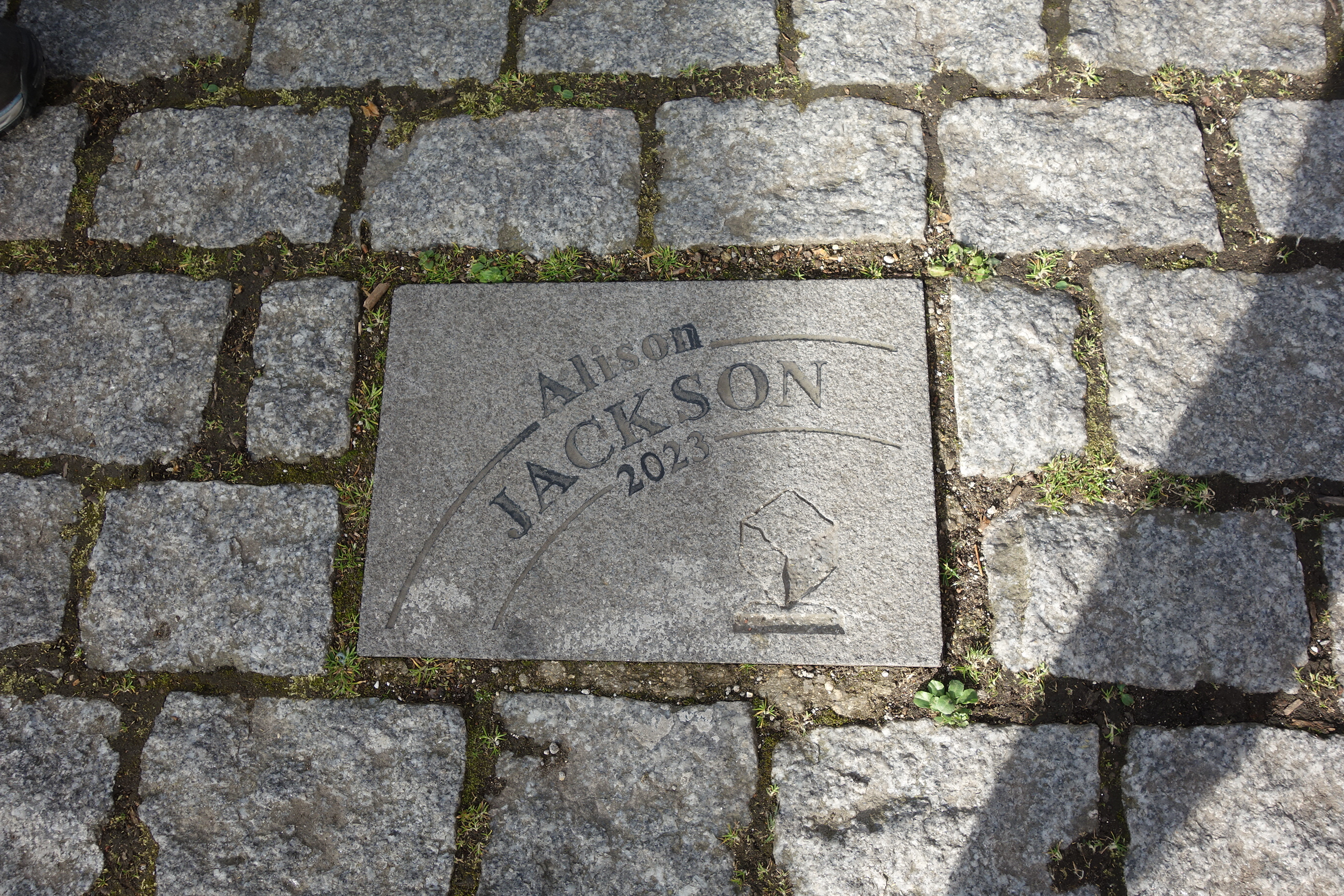
Plaque commemorating Alison Jackson's victory in the 2023 edition of the race

As with the men's race, the winner receives a granite sett (cobblestone) as a trophy. The winner is also commemorated by a plaque in the last sector of pavé (Espace Charles Crupelandt) leading to the Roubaix Velodrome. As of 2026, no women have won the race more than once, indeed the six 'queens of the north' to that date have represented six different nations.

Year	Rider	Team
2020	Race cancelled due to COVID-19	
2021	(United Kingdom) Lizzie Deignan	Trek–Segafredo
2022	(Italy) Elisa Longo Borghini	Trek–Segafredo
2023	(Canada) Alison Jackson	EF Education–Tibco–SVB
2024	(Belgium) Lotte Kopecky	Team SD Worx–Protime
2025	(France) Pauline Ferrand-Prévot	Visma–Lease a Bike
2026	(Germany) Franziska Koch	FDJ United–Suez

== Statistics ==
- Shortest Paris–Roubaix Femmes: 115.6 kilometres (71.8 mi) (2021)
- Longest Paris–Roubaix Femmes: 148.5 kilometres (92.3 mi) (2024 and 2025)
- Most cobblestones: 33.7 kilometres (20.9 mi) (2026)
- Most podium finishes: Marianne Vos, Pauline Ferrand-Prévot, Lotte Kopecky, Elisa Longo Borghini (2)
- Largest margin between the winner and runner-up: 1 minute and 17 seconds (Lizzie Deignan in 2021)
