= 2020 Paris–Roubaix Femmes =

2020 UCI Women's World Tour, race 15 of 16

Race details
- Dates: 25 October 2020
- Stages: 1
- Distance: 116 km (72 mi)

The 2020 Paris–Roubaix Femmes was a one-day road cycling race scheduled to take place on 25 October 2020, on the same day as the postponed men's race, which had been rescheduled from its traditional date in April due to the COVID-19 pandemic. The announcement of the inaugural women's edition of Paris–Roubaix came as a surprise addition to the revised 2020 UCI Women's World Tour calendar.

However, on 9 October 2020, the race was cancelled due to an increase of coronavirus cases in France. The race would have been the first women's edition of Paris–Roubaix. The first edition of Paris–Roubaix Femmes subsequently took place in 2021.

== Route ==
The inaugural women's edition of Paris–Roubaix would have started in Denain and finished on the velodrome in Roubaix covering 116 km (72 mi). It would have featured 29.2 km (18.1 mi) of cobblestones, spread out over 17 sectors.

== Teams ==
Eight UCI Women's WorldTeams and fifteen UCI Women's Continental Teams were due to make up the twenty-three competing teams.

UCI Women's WorldTeams

- Alé BTC Ljubljana
- Canyon//SRAM
- CCC - Liv
- FDJ Nouvelle-Aquitaine Futuroscope
- Mitchelton–Scott
- Movistar Team
- Team Sunweb
- Trek–Segafredo

UCI Women's Continental Teams

- Arkéa Pro Cycling Team
- Aromitalia–Basso Bikes–Vaiano
- Astana
- Bepink
- Boels–Dolmans
- Ceratizit–WNT Pro Cycling
- Charente-Maritime Women Cycling
- Cogeas–Mettler–Look
- Équipe Paule Ka
- Hitec Products–Birk Sport
- Lotto–Soudal Ladies
- Parkhotel Valkenburg
- Rally Cycling
- Tibco–Silicon Valley Bank
- Valcar–Travel & Service

== See also ==
- 2020 in women's road cycling
