= Classic cycle races =

Road cycling race

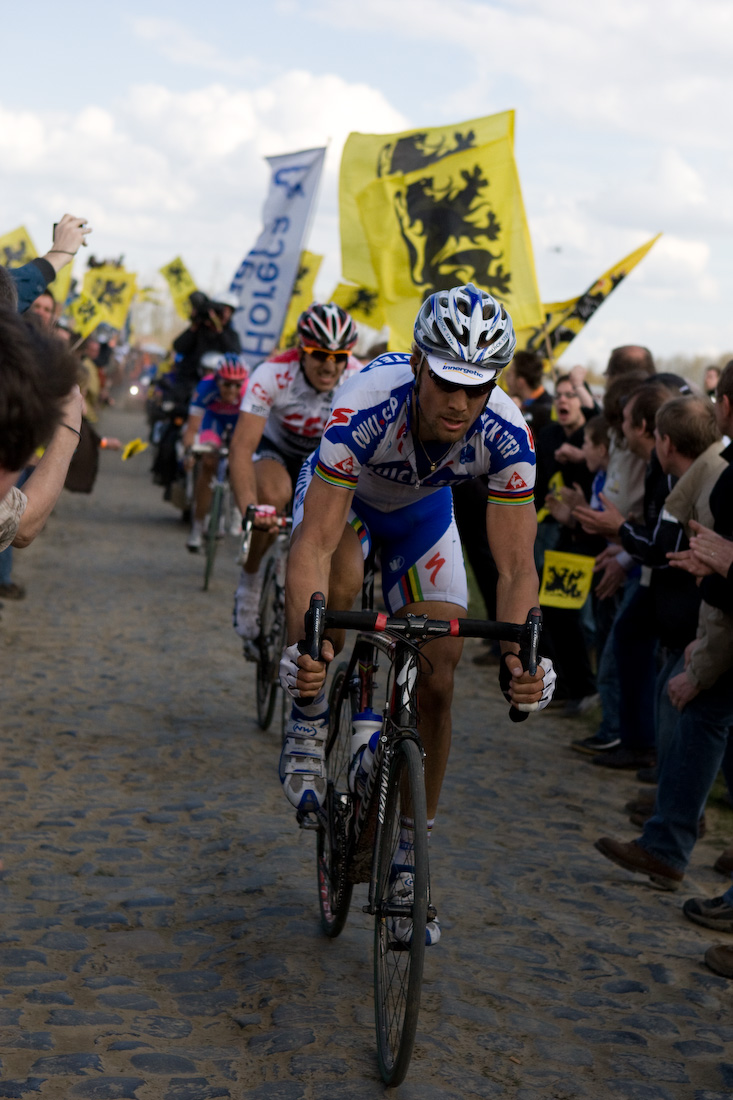
Tom Boonen followed by Fabian Cancellara in 2008 Paris–Roubaix, one of the classic cycle races.

The classic cycle races are the most prestigious one-day professional road cycling races in the international calendar. Some of these events date back to the 19th century. They are normally held at roughly the same time each year. The five most revered races are often described as the cycling monuments.

For the 2005 to 2007 seasons, some classics formed part of the UCI ProTour run by the Union Cycliste Internationale. This event series also included various stage races including the Tour de France, Giro d'Italia, Vuelta a España, Paris–Nice, and the Critérium du Dauphiné Libéré. The UCI ProTour replaced the UCI Road World Cup series (1989–2004) which contained only one-day races. Many of the classics, and all the Grand Tours, were not part of the UCI ProTour for the 2008 season because of disputes between the UCI and the ASO, which organizes the Tour de France and several other major races. Since 2009, many classic cycle races are part of the UCI World Tour.

Since the early 2000s, many classic events have started women's races, now part of the UCI Women's World Tour.

== Problems with definition ==
Although cycling fans and sports media eagerly use the term "classic", there is no clear consensus about what constitutes a classic cycling race. UCI, the international governing body of cycling, has no mention at all of the term in its rulings. This poses problems to define the characteristics of these races and makes it impossible to make precise lists. Several criteria are used to denote the importance of a cycling race: date of creation, historical importance and tradition, commercial importance, location, level of difficulty, level of competition field, etc. However, many of these paradigms tend to shift over time and are often opinions of a personal nature. One of the few objective criteria is the official categorization of races as classified by the UCI, although this is not a defining feature either, as many fans dispute the presence of some of the highest-categorized races and some older races are not included in the UCI World Tour.

Because of the growing ambiguity and inflation of the term "classic", the much younger term "monument" was introduced at the end of the 20th century to denote the five most revered of the classic cycling races.

== Classic cycle races ==
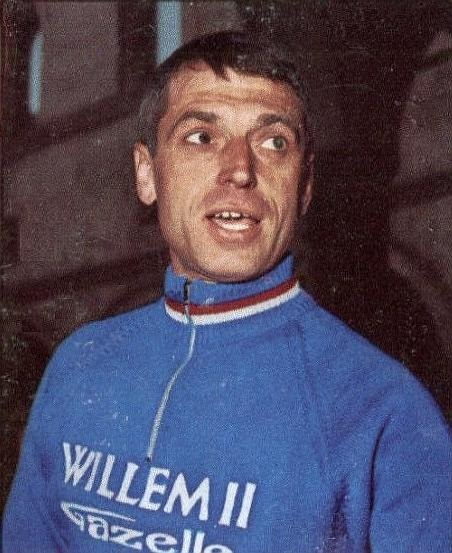
Only Rik Van Looy won all 8 original classics.

Until the 1980s there were originally eight recognised classics, the five Monuments (see Cycling Monuments below) plus La Flèche Wallonne, Paris–Brussels and Paris–Tours. Due to various traffic and organizational problems these events came and went in various guises (for example, Paris–Tours became Blois–Chaville, before returning in its current form). Paris–Brussels disappeared altogether between 1967 and 1976. Flèche Wallonne was always on the Saturday before Liege–Bastogne–Liege (it was known as The Ardennes Weekend), before being shortened and moved to the preceding Wednesday. The remaining five then became known as the 'Monuments'.

Rik van Looy is the only rider to win all eight. Eddy Merckx and Roger De Vlaeminck both won seven, both missing out at Paris–Tours.

- Monuments highlighted in **bold**.
- UCI World Tour races are italicized.

=== Season openers ===
Season openers are usually not regarded as highly as other classics apart from the Omloop, but receive a lot of attention because of their position early in the season, typically in February.

- (Belgium) Omloop Het Nieuwsblad – opening the Belgian cycling season
- (Belgium) Kuurne–Brussels–Kuurne -which is held the day following Omloop Het Nieuwsblad
- (France) Grand Prix La Marseillaise – opening the French cycling season
- (Italy) Trofeo Laigueglia – opening the Italian cycling season
- (Spain) Trofeo Pollença – opening the Spanish cycling season as part of the Vuelta a Mallorca

=== Spring classics ===
==== Italian spring classics ====
- (Italy) Strade Bianche – race that includes sections of strade bianche gravel roads. Despite its relatively short history, the Strade Bianche has quickly gained significant prestige, the uniqueness of its parcours sometimes drawing comparison with Paris-Roubaix. First held in 2007. By the mid 2020s, media and riders discussed the possibility of the race being elevated to a "cycling monument" in future.
- (Italy) Milano–Torino – first run in 1876, the race has sometimes been held in the autumn and had some continuity problems due to financial problems but returned to the UCI calendar in 2012. From 2022, the race was moved from autumn to spring, before Milan-San Remo. It is the oldest classic race in the world
- (Italy) **Milan–San Remo** – the first monument of the year, its Italian name is La Primavera ("The Spring") or La classicissima. This race is normally held on the Saturday closest to the vernal equinox. First run in 1907. It is the longest classic by distance, and is often considered a 'sprinter's classic' despite a number of notable climbs, as it tends toward bunch sprint finishes
- (Italy) Trofeo Alfredo Binda – one of the oldest and most established races in the women's calendar, having first been held in 1974, and part of the Women's World Tour since it was founded in 2016, and unusual at that level in being without a male equivalent.

==== Cobbled classics ====
- (Belgium) Tour of Bruges - formerly a stage race since 1977, now a one day event since 2018
- (Belgium) E3 Harelbeke – the first of the "Spring Classics" in Flanders, first held in 1958
- (Belgium) Gent–Wevelgem – first raced in 1934, in recent years held on the Sunday between Milan–San Remo and the Tour of Flanders
- (Belgium) Dwars door Vlaanderen - the final warm up for The Tour of Flanders, held annually since 1945
- (Belgium) **Tour of Flanders** – (Ronde van Vlaanderen) is normally raced in early April, first held in 1913
- (Belgium) Scheldeprijs - known as the sprinter's classic due to its flat course, held annually since 1907
- (France) **Paris–Roubaix** – La Reine ("Queen of the Classics") or l'Enfer du Nord ("The Hell of the North") is traditionally held one week after the Tour of Flanders, and was first raced in 1896. Arguably the most famous of all the classics, the race is dominated by multiple pavé sections, and ends in a circuit of the Roubaix Velodrome

==== Ardennes classics ====
- (Netherlands) Amstel Gold Race – normally held mid-April, it is the first of the three Ardennes Classics or hill classics, one week after Paris–Roubaix. First run in 1966.
- (Belgium) La Flèche Wallonne – the Walloon Arrow is the second Ardennes Classic, since 2004 held mid-week between the Amstel Gold Race and Liège–Bastogne–Liège. First run in 1936.
- (Belgium) **Liège–Bastogne–Liège** – La Doyenne, the oldest monument, was first raced in 1892. It is the third Ardennes Classic, held in late April, one week after the Amstel Gold Race. A race characterized by multiple short, steep climbs, it is often considered the most physically arduous of the classics, rewarding stamina and explosiveness.

=== Summer classics ===
After Liège, the one-day races begin to give way to the stage races leading to the Grand Tours between May and September. Although there are no 'monuments' in this period, some important summer classics are held from July to September.

- Eschborn–Frankfurt - held annually on May 1st, Labour Day in Germany
- Clásica de San Sebastián – known as Donostia–Donostia in Spain
- (Germany) Hamburg Cyclassics, formerly HEW Cyclassics and Vattenfall Cyclassics
- (Italy) Trittico Lombardo – three separate races in Lombardy, traditionally in August but since 2014 moved to September:
  - Coppa Ugo Agostoni – held on Saturday
  - Coppa Bernocchi – held on Sunday a day after Coppa Ugo Agostoni
  - Tre Valli Varesine – the Three valleys of Varese, held on Tuesday 4 days before Giro di Lombardia since 2015
- Grand Prix de Fourmies – held since 1928 in Northern France, held on a Sunday in the first half of September since 1976, a week or two after Bretagne Classic
- Bretagne Classic – held on a Sunday in late August on a circuit near the small Breton village of Plouay, traditionally known as Grand Prix Ouest France – Plouay
- Laurentian Classics – two one-day races in Canada, named after the Saint Lawrence River that runs through Quebec, organized since 2010
  - Grand Prix Cycliste de Québec – raced on a Friday in early September
  - Grand Prix Cycliste de Montréal – held on Sunday two days after the Grand Prix de Québec

=== Autumn classics ===
Following the end of the Vuelta a España in early September, the nature of the racing once more tends towards the one-day races. The autumn classics are held from September to November.

- (France) (Belgium) Paris–Brussels – First held in 1893, since 2013 renamed the Brussels Cycling Classic and only run on Belgian territory, held in early June since 2022
- (France) Paris–Tours – known as the "Sprinters' Classic", first race in 1896. Since 2018, the route has included gravel sectors in vineyards
- (Italy) Giro dell'Emilia – one week before the Giro di Lombardia, one of the hardest Classics on the calendar, with the famous San Luca, Bologna, circuit
- (Italy) Giro del Piemonte – first run in 1906.
- (Italy) **Giro di Lombardia** – also known as the "Race of the Falling Leaves", first held in 1905 as Milano–Milano. Considered the biggest Autumn Classic in cycling, and the only post-Spring Monument, it is often referred to as the 'climber's classic' in comparison to the early spring 'sprinter's classic', Milan–San Remo, with significant long climbs throughout, including the iconic Madonna del Ghisallo.
- Coppa Sabatini - a one day race held in October in Pisa, Italy since 1952
- Japan Cup – held since 1992, at the end of October, around Utsunomiya

== Past classics ==
Some Classics have disappeared, often because of financial problems. These include:

- (France) Paris–Brest–Paris – an exceptionally long event (ca. 1200 km), held once every 10 years from 1891 to 1951 as a professional race
- (France) Bordeaux–Paris – the gruelling 560 km, partly motor-paced event, run from 1891 to 1988
- (United Kingdom) Wincanton Classic – held from 1989 to 1997, the most important British race in the 1990s
- (Portugal) Porto–Lisboa – held from 1911 to 2004 (the longest one-day classic from 1989 until it was cancelled)
- (Switzerland) Züri-Metzgete – also known as the Championship of Zürich, held from 1914 to 2006; in its heyday considered the sixth Monument
- (Italy) Giro del Lazio – held from 1933 to 2008 (The race returned briefly in 2013 and 2014 as the Roma Maxima) and returned again in 2026
- (Italy) Giro della Romagna – held from 1911 to 2011 (the race merged with the Memorial Marco Pantani in 2013, as they were both held in Emilia–Romagna)

== Cycling monuments ==
The Monuments are generally considered to be the oldest, hardest and most prestigious one-day events in cycling. They each have a long history and specific individual characteristics. They are currently the one-day races in which most points can be earned in the UCI World Tour.

- (Italy) Milan–San Remo – the first major Classic of the year, its Italian name is La Primavera (the spring), because it is held in late March. First run in 1907, it is considered the sprinter's classic. This race is particularly long (ca. 300 km (190 mi)) though mostly flat along the Ligurian coast, enabling sprinters to compete.
- (Belgium) Tour of Flanders – the Ronde van Vlaanderen in Dutch/Flemish, the first of the Cobbled classics, is raced every first Sunday of April. It was first held in 1913, making it the youngest of the five Monuments. Notable for the narrow short hills (hellingen) in the Flemish Ardennes, usually steep and cobbled, the route forces the best riders to continually fight for space at the front. The course changes slightly every year: since 2017 the race starts in Antwerp and since 2012 finishes in Oudenaarde.
- (France) Paris–Roubaix – the Queen of the Classics or l'Enfer du Nord ("The Hell of the North") is raced traditionally one week after the Tour of Flanders and is the last of the cobbled races. It was first organized in 1896. The flattest of the monuments, its decisive sites are the many long sections of pavé (roads of large, rough cobblestones) making it hard on the racers' bodies. Crashes and punctures are common, and considered a feature of the racing. It is considered by many to be the most heroic one-day cycling event of the year. The race finishes on the iconic Roubaix Velodrome. At the end of the race, riders are usually covered in dirt or mud in what is considered one of the most brutal tests of mental and physical endurance in all of cycling.
- (Belgium) Liège–Bastogne–Liège – held in late April. La Doyenne, the oldest Classic, is the last of the Ardennes classics and usually the last of the spring races. It was first organized in 1892 as an amateur event; a professional edition followed in 1894. It is a long and arduous race notable for its many sharp hills in the Ardennes and uphill finish in the industrial suburbs of Liège, favouring climbers and even grand tour specialists.
- (Italy) Giro di Lombardia – the Autumn Classic or the Race of the Falling Leaves, is held in October or late September. Initially organized as Milano–Milano in 1905, it was called the Giro di Lombardia (Tour of Lombardy) in 1907 and Il Lombardia in 2012. It is notable for its hilly and varied course around the Como Lake with a flat finish in Bergamo or a hilly finish in Como. In 2012 it had a new, earlier date at the end of September, one week after the World Championship. From 2013 to 2017 it was held in the first week of October. Since 2018 it has been held on a Saturday in the second week of October. It is often won by climbers with a strong sprint finish.

== Women's events ==
Since the early 2000s, many classic events have started women's races, now part of the UCI Women's World Tour. These events are often held on the same day or on the same weekend of the men's races.

Four of the five cycling 'monuments' have equivalent races: Tour of Flanders (first held in 2004), Liège–Bastogne–Liège Femmes (first held in 2017), Paris–Roubaix Femmes (first held in 2021) and Milan–San Remo Women (held 1999–2005, 2025–). Other classic women's races include Trofeo Alfredo Binda (first held in 1974), La Flèche Wallonne Femmes (first held in 1998), Amstel Gold Race (first held in 2001) and Strade Bianche Donne (first held in 2015).

== See also ==
- Ruban Jaune
- List of road bicycle racing events
- Grand Tour (cycling)
- Flanders Classics
