= Wallers =

- Commune
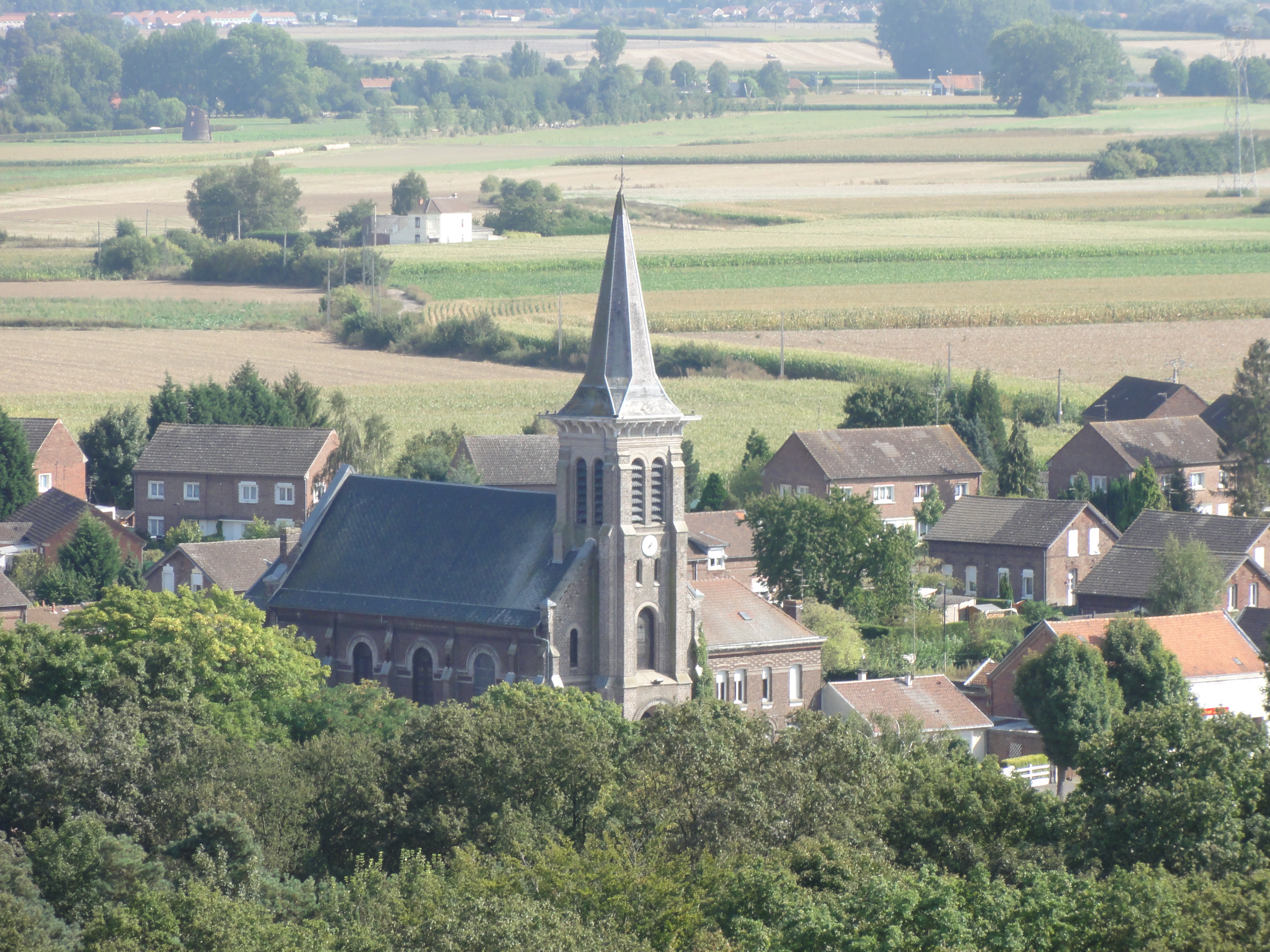
- The Church of St. Barbara viewed from the mines of Anzin

- Coat of arms
- Location of Wallers
- Location within France Location within Hauts-de-France
- Coordinates: 50°22′30″N 3°23′31″E
- Country: France
- Region: Hauts-de-France
- Department: Nord
- Arrondissement: Valenciennes
- Canton: Saint-Amand-les-Eaux
- Intercommunality: Porte du Hainaut

Government
  - Mayor (2024–2026): Bernard Caron
- Area^{1}: 20.89 km^{2} (8.07 sq mi)
- Elevation: 23 m (75 ft)
- Highest elevation: 135 m (443 ft)
- Lowest elevation: 15 m (49 ft)
- Population (2023): 5,633
  - Density: 269.7/km^{2} (698.4/sq mi)
- Time zone: UTC+01:00 (CET)
  - Summer (DST): UTC+02:00 (CEST)
- INSEE/Postal code: 59632 /59135
- ^{1} French Land Register data, which excludes lakes, ponds, glaciers > 1 km^{2} (0.386 sq mi or 247 acres) and river estuaries.

Wallers (French pronunciation: [walɛʁs]) is a commune in the Nord department in northern France.

It is known for the Trench of Arenberg, part of the Paris–Roubaix cycling race, held annually in April.

== Heraldry ==
Arms of Wallers	The arms of Wallers are blazoned : Or, 3 fesses gules. (Saint-Hilaire-lez-Cambrai, Villereau and Wallers, Rambures use the same arms.)

== Population ==
Historical population
Year	Pop.	±% p.a.
1968	7,508	—
1975	7,105	−0.79%
1982	6,564	−1.13%
1990	5,862	−1.40%
1999	5,582	−0.54%
2007	5,533	−0.11%
2012	5,552	+0.07%
2017	5,526	−0.09%
2023	5,633	+0.32%
Source: INSEE

== See also ==
- Communes of the Nord department
