= Carrefour de l'Arbre =

Cobbled road in Hauts-de-France, France

Coordinates: 50.59646°N 3.236146°E

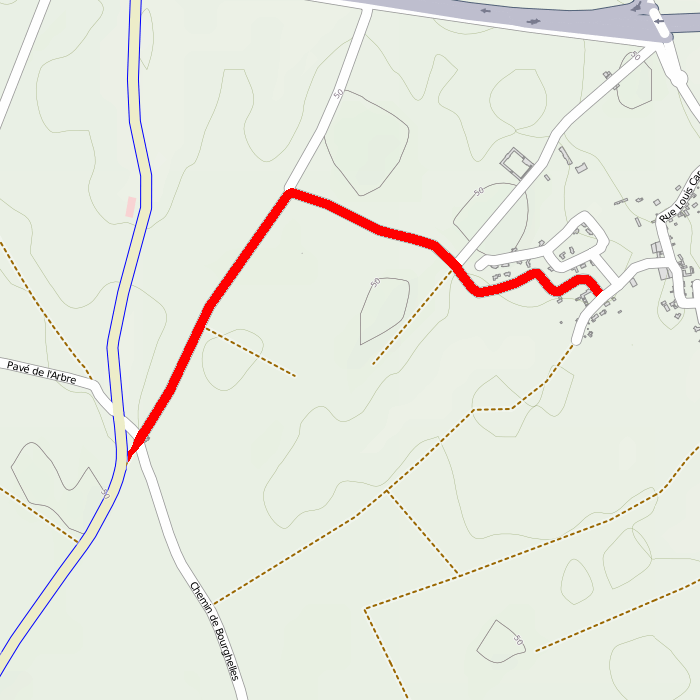
location of the first half of Carrefour de l'Arbre cobbled road

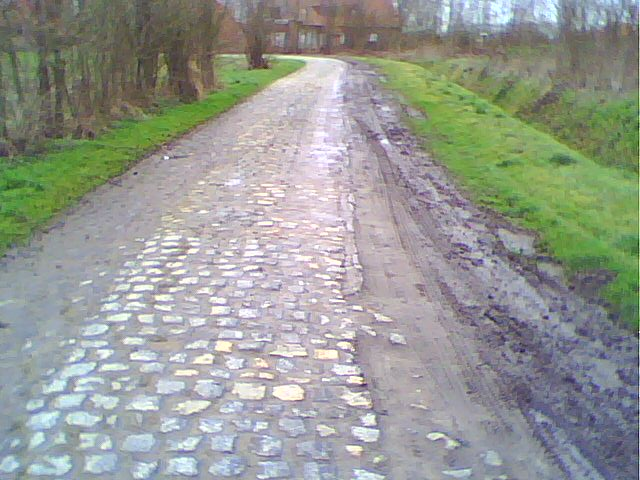
First stretches of Carrefour de l'Arbre.

Carrefour de l'Arbre, officially Pavé de Luchin, is a 2.1 km (1.3 mi) cobbled road in the municipalities of Camphin-en-Pévèle, Baisieux-Sin and Gruson, in the Nord department of Northern France. The location was the setting of the Battle of Bouvines, which ended the Anglo-French War in 1214. Today, the road is best known from the cycling classic Paris–Roubaix, where it has often proved decisive due to its proximity to Roubaix and cumulative difficulty.

== Characteristics ==
Carrefour de l'Arbre (English: Crossroads of the Tree) is on open land between Gruson and Camphin-en-Pévèle. The road starts westward from Camphin-en-Pévèle along the Rue de Cysoing towards Camphin de l'Arbre. The first half consists of a series of corners over highly irregular pavé towards Luchin. The second half starts after crossing an asphalt road and finishes at the Café de l'Arbre restaurant.

== Paris–Roubaix ==
The road is one of three "five-star" pavé sectors of Paris–Roubaix, together with Mons-en-Pévèle and the Trouée d'Arenberg. It is considered one of the hardest passages of the race because of the bad state of the cobbles. As it comes at 15 km (9.3 mi) from the finish in Roubaix it is a pivotal location of the race and has often proved decisive.
