= Roubaix Velodrome =

Third velodrome of the five cycling monuments

- Vélodrome André-Pétrieux
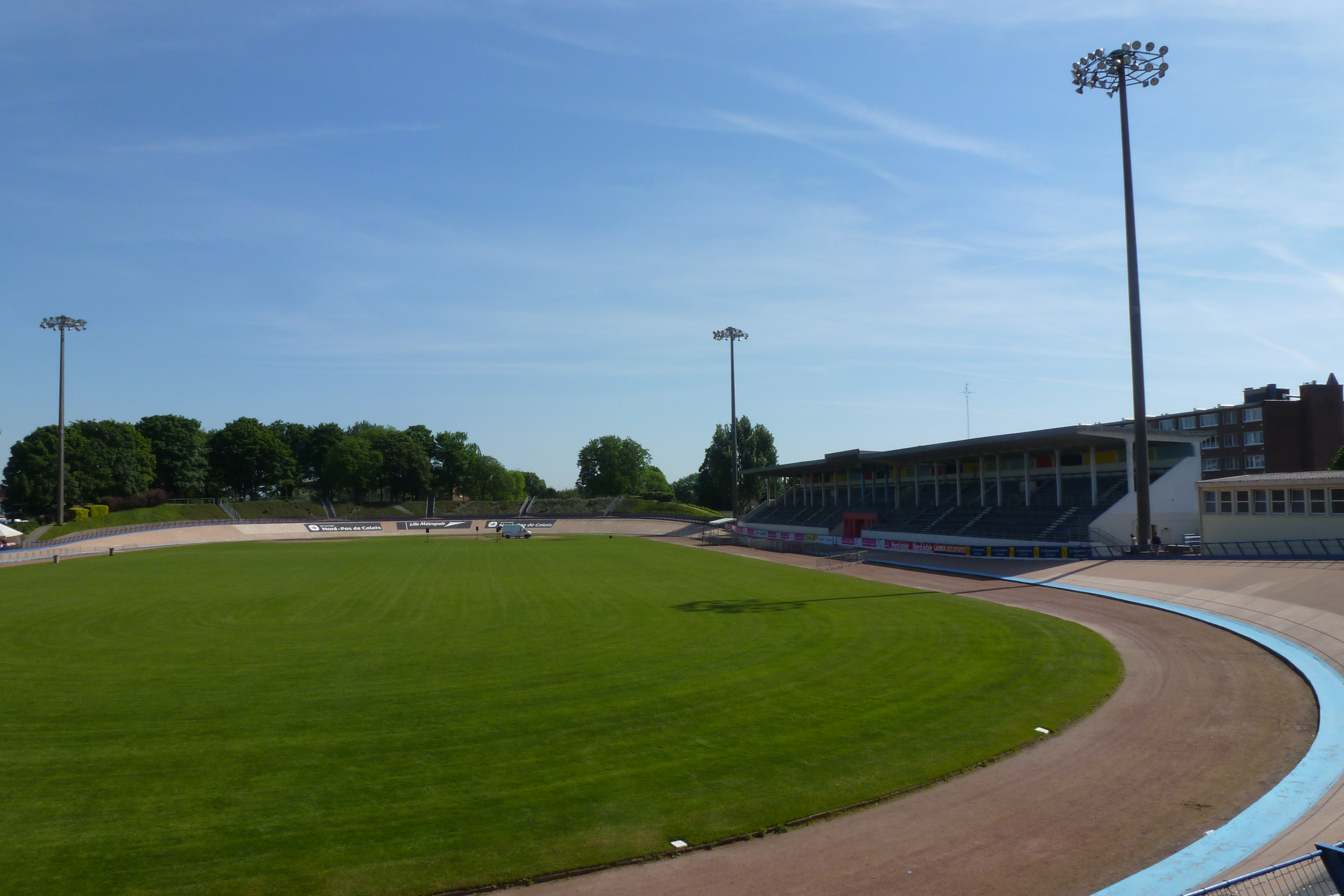
- The velodrome in 2012
- Interactive map of Roubaix Velodrome
- Location: Roubaix, Nord, France
- Coordinates: 50.6781°N 3.2052°E
- Owner: City of Roubaix
- Capacity: 2,000
- Surface: Concrete
- Field size: 500 m (550 yd) track

Construction
- Opened: 1936

Tenant
- Vélo Club Roubaix Lille Métropole

The Roubaix Velodrome (officially Vélodrome André-Pétrieux) is a velodrome in Roubaix, Nord, France. It was opened in 1936 and has hosted the finish of the one-day "monument classic" cycling race Paris–Roubaix since 1943, and the Paris–Roubaix Femmes since its inception in 2021.

The race moved to the current stadium in 1943, and there it has stayed with the exceptions of 1986, 1987 and 1988 when the finish was in the avenue des Nations-Unies, outside the offices of La Redoute, the mail-order company which sponsored the race.

The shower room inside the velodrome is distinctive for the open, three-sided, low-walled concrete stalls, each with a brass plaque to commemorate a winner. These include Peter Van Petegem, Eddy Merckx, Peter Sagan, Roger De Vlaeminck, Rik Van Looy and Fausto Coppi.

The velodrome is located in the Parc des Sports, on the eastern outskirts of Roubaix, less than two kilometres from the Belgian border. The grass field on the inside of the track is used as a venue for Roubaix' rugby team. In 2012, a new multi-purpose indoor velodrome with a 250 m track, the Stab Vélodrome de Roubaix, opened next to the Roubaix Velodrome.

== See also ==
- List of cycling tracks and velodromes
