= Mons-en-Pévèle =

- Commune
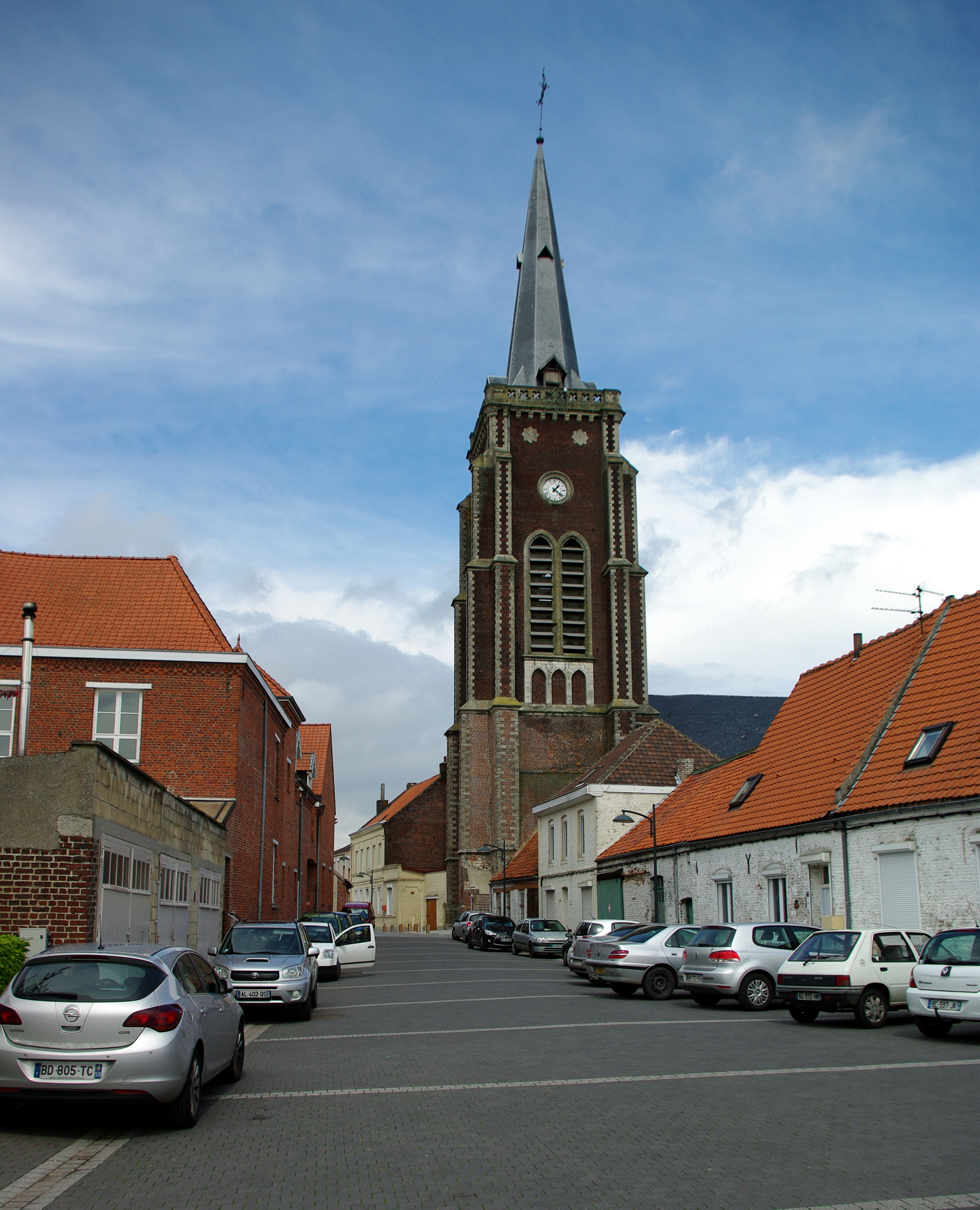
- The church in Mons-en-Pévèle

- Coat of arms
- Location of Mons-en-Pévèle
- Location within France Location within Hauts-de-France
- Coordinates: 50°28′49″N 3°06′11″E
- Country: France
- Region: Hauts-de-France
- Department: Nord
- Arrondissement: Lille
- Canton: Templeuve-en-Pévèle
- Intercommunality: CC Pévèle-Carembault

Government
  - Mayor (2020–2026): Sylvain Pérez
- Area^{1}: 12.37 km^{2} (4.78 sq mi)
- Elevation: 107 m (351 ft)
- Highest elevation: 107 m (351 ft)
- Lowest elevation: 32 m (105 ft)
- Population (2023): 2,075
  - Density: 167.7/km^{2} (434.5/sq mi)
- Time zone: UTC+01:00 (CET)
  - Summer (DST): UTC+02:00 (CEST)
- INSEE/Postal code: 59411 /59246
- ^{1} French Land Register data, which excludes lakes, ponds, glaciers > 1 km^{2} (0.386 sq mi or 247 acres) and river estuaries.

Mons-en-Pévèle (French pronunciation: [mɔ̃s ɑ̃ pevɛl]; Dutch: Pevelenberg) is a commune in the Nord department in northern France.

== Population ==
Historical population
Year	Pop.	±% p.a.
1968	1,921	—
1975	1,962	+0.30%
1982	2,180	+1.52%
1990	2,064	−0.68%
1999	2,054	−0.05%
2007	2,158	+0.62%
2012	2,143	−0.14%
2017	2,134	−0.08%
2023	2,075	−0.47%
Source: INSEE

== Heraldry ==
Arms of Mons-en-Pévèle	The arms of Mons-en-Pévèle are blazoned: Or, a cross moline gules. (Annœullin, Bauvin and Mons-en-Pévèle use the same arms.)

== See also ==
- Communes of the Nord department
- Battle of Mons-en-Pévèle (1304)
