= Frédérique Lucien =

French visual artist (born 1960)

- Born: 28 September 1960 (age 66); Briançon, France
- Education: École Nationale Supérieure des Beaux-Arts, Paris, France
- Awards: Villa Medici Residency (Académie de France à Rome); Cartier Foundation grant; Jean François Millet Prize; Roger Lacourière Prize

Frédérique Lucien (born September 28, 1960 in Briançon, France) is a French visual artist, works in drawing, painting and ceramics.

== Biography ==
Frédérique Lucien graduated from the École Nationale Supérieure des Beaux-Arts in Paris in 1987, where her teacher was Joël Kermarrec. Her work has been developing since the 1990s, and her subject matter has focused on plants, minerals, organics and the human body. She works in series and simultaneously on different themes. She treats the human body mainly with drawing, sculpture and ceramics, and plants with drawing and cut-out paper. Her works are present in numerous public collections in France (Fonds national d'art contemporain), as well as abroad, at the Inter-American Development Bank and Budapest Kiscell Museum, for instance).

She had a residency at the Académie de France in Rome during the 1991-1992 season.

Frédérique Lucien's first solo exhibition took place in 1990 at the Galerie Jean Fournier in Paris. She regularly worked with editors Éric Seydoux and Michael Woolworth.

A retrospective exhibition of her printed work took place at the Gravelines museum in 2002. In 2010, 2011 and 2012, the Zadkine Museum in Paris, the Museum of Fine Arts in Brest, Caen and Vannes exhibited a retrospective of the artist's work.

Frédérique Lucien was listed in the Universal Dictionary of Creators in 2013.

Describing her own work, she states, "Une feuille est une feuille, une bouche est une bouche, mais l'arbre ou la personne à laquelle elles appartiennent font qu'elles sont forcément dissemblables, qu'elles ont chacune une "personnalité" propre. C'est cette spécificité que je m'efforce de montrer." A leaf is a leaf, a mouth is a mouth, but the tree or the person to which they belong means that they are necessarily dissimilar, that they each have their own "personality". It is this specificity that I strive to show.

== Awards ==
- 1991: Residency at the Villa Medici, French Academy in Rome, Rome, Italy
- 1992: Grant from the Cartier Foundation, workshop in residence, Jouy-en-Josas
- 1992: Jean François Millet Prize, Valognes.
- 2004: Foundation of France, Roger Lacourière Prize, Paris, France.

== La Couleuvre, exhibition space for contemporary art ==
Frédérique Lucien co-founded La Couleuvre, an exhibition space for contemporary art located in Saint-Ouen, in 2012. Artists who design exhibits at Couleuvre are given carte blanche as "commissioners" in charge of imagining a project and inviting other artists to participate in their exhibitions. La Couleuvre also tries to advocate for the work of women artists by providing them with space for solo exhibitions. Thus, artists such as Christelle Familiari, Elsa Tomkowiak, Anne-Marie Cornu or Margaret Dearing were able to exhibit their work there. La Couleuvre also organizes screenings of rare videos and films. Other members of the collective are Philippe Richard (co-founder), Elina Löwensohn, Olivier Soulerin and Bertrand Mandico.

== Solo exhibitions (selected) ==
- 1990: Pistils, Jean Fournier Gallery, Paris.
- 1992: Frédérique Lucien, M&M gallery, Cannes.
- 1992: Villa Medici, French Academy in Rome.
- 1995: "When summer has almost gone," De Vaalserberg, Rotterdam, Netherlands.
- 1995: Eric Dupont Gallery, Toulouse.
- 1995: House of Culture, Amiens.
- 1996: House of contemporary art in Chaillioux, Fresnes*.
- 1996: La Box, a place for Contemporary Art, Bourges*.
- 1996: Jean Fournier Gallery, Paris.
- 1997: La VIGIE-Contemporary Art, Nimes*.
- 1997: Sainte Agathe, School of Fine Arts, Quimper*.
- 1998: Raum fur Kunst Gallery, French Institute, Graz, Austria.
- 1998: Eric Dupont Gallery, Paris.
- 2000: National Stage, Theater of Angers.
- 2000: Saint Germain Museum, Auxerre.
- 2002: Histograms of hopes, Atelier Eric Seydoux, Paris. 2001
- 2002: Museum of Drawing and Original Prints, Gravelines.
- 2003: Aître Saint-Maclou, School of Fine Arts, Rouen.
- 2005: Former Jesuit College, Reims.
- 2006: Labium, Atelier Eric Seydoux, Paris.
- 2006: Jean Fournier Gallery, Paris.
- 2007: Gallery Where, Marseille.
- 2007: Natural elements, Yamaki Fine Art Gallery, Kobe, Japan.
- 2008: Beginnings, Galerie Jean Fournier, Paris.
- 2011: Introspectives, Brest Museum of Fine Arts .
- 2011: Introspectives, Caen Museum of Fine Arts .
- 2011: Anonymous, Jean Fournier Gallery, Paris.
- 2011: Introspectives, Zadkine Museum, Paris.
- 2012: Introspectives, Museum of Fine Arts La Cohue de Vannes.
- 2012: Without repentance, on a proposal by Otto Teichert, The Boiler Room, Haute École des Arts du Rhin, Strasbourg.
- 2013: Omphalos, Jean Fournier Gallery, Paris.
- 2013: Feuiller, Réjane Louin gallery, Locquirec.
- 2015: IL, Jean Fournier Gallery, Paris.
- 2016: Frédérique Lucien, prints, artist's books, Leizorovici gallery, Paris.
- 2018: Frames and variations, Galerie Jean Fournier, Paris
- 2019: Body and sets, Matisse Museum, Nice

== Public and private collections (selected) ==
- Bryn Mawr College, Bryn Mawr, Pennsylvania, USA
- Municipal Contemporary Art Fund of the City of Paris (FMAC), Paris
- National Fund for Contemporary Art, Puteaux
- Regional Fund for Contemporary Art, Brittany
- Inter-American Development Bank; Cultural Center, Washington, USA
- Kiscell Museum, Budapest, Hungary
- Val-de-Marne Museum of Contemporary Art, Vitry-sur-Seine
- Museum of Drawing and Original Prints, Gravelines
- Museum - Saint-Germain Abbey, Auxerre
- House of books, images and sound, Villeurbanne
- National Library of France, Paris
- Ministry of Foreign Affairs, Paris
- Vannes media library collection
- Collection CNEAÏ (National Center for Contemporary Art dedicated to the field of artist publication and media work), Chatou.
- Library, square of art of Nîmes.
- La Cohue Museum of Fine Arts in Vannes
- Museum of Fine Arts of Caen
- Brest Fine Arts Museum
- National factory of Sèvres
