= Musée des Beaux-Arts de Cambrai =

Museum in Cambrai, France

Musée de Cambrai
- Established: 2 May 1847
- Location: Cambrai, Hauts-de-France, France
- Coordinates: 50°10′23″N 3°13′47″E
- Visitors: 30,000 (2003)

The Musée de Cambrai (English: Cambrai Museum), also known as the Musée des Beaux-arts de Cambrai, is the main museum in the northern French city of Cambrai. It moved in 1893 into the Hôtel de Francqueville, which dates back to 1720, and was renovated and expanded in 1994.

It holds collections of archaeology, visual arts and local heritage. Of particular note among the holdings are works by Flemish and Dutch painters of the 17th century and French artists of the 19th and 20th centuries, and a collection of osteoarchaeology which is unique in France. The museum holds works by artists including Auguste Rodin, Camille Claudel, James Tissot, and Henri Matisse, and contains a significant collection of geometric abstraction.

== The Hôtel de Francqueville ==
Jean-Baptiste de Francqueville, Lord of Bourlon, had a mansion built between April 1719 and December 1720 in the Parisian style, with a courtyard and a garden. The use of French fashion is explained by Jean-Baptiste de Francqueville’s position as a royal advisor and secretary in a territory newly annexed to France. This mansion is located on a street with several older mansions.

The gate is adorned with sculpted elements typical of the decorative style from the end of the reign of Louis XIV and the Regency, opening onto a wide archway with vegetal motifs in bas-relief. This gate contrasts with the simplicity of the main building, which has three levels and alternates between brick and limestone, following the model of French classical architecture. Historically, the original entrance was through the spacious vestibule, which housed the grand staircase leading to the salons facing the garden.

The mansion is connected to the history of Cambrai. In 1816, it was requisitioned by the English army to accommodate the Duke of Wellington. The mansion was restored at the end of the 19th century in an eclectic style, which can still be seen in the ground-floor salons today.

The interior of the museum

When the wealthy industrialist Auguste Legrand bequeathed his mansion to the city of Cambrai in 1888 to display the collections of the municipal museum, the living spaces were adapted for this purpose, and a large brick salon was created to accommodate large-format works. In 1990, two modern wings were added to the mansion to expand the museum's spaces (storage, workroom, etc.).

== History ==
Showroom

The museum was created in 1847 to present to the public the remnants of the revolutionary seizures made in the old episcopal city of Cambrai. The museum was originally housed in the former offices of the National Guard located in the town hall. It was enriched in the following years by purchases, donations and deposits from the State. Among other items, the Musée de Cambrai received in 1863 forty-three pieces of Greek and Etruscan ceramics from the collection of the disgraced Italian art collector Giampietro Campana.

Between 1860 and 1870, the museum opened up to regional history (archaeology and lapidary). In 1865 the collections were transferred to the nuns' chapel and refectory of the former Saint-Julien hospital. The fine arts collections were enriched, and contemporary art was given a prominent place.

The substantial growth of the collections led to their transfer in 1893 to the Hôtel de Francqueville, one of the most beautiful mansions built in the 18th century in Cambrai. (Note: Between April 1719 and December 1720 Jean-Baptiste de Francqueville, seigneur of Bourlon, had built the Hôtel de Francqueville, a Parisian-style hôtel particulier entre cour et jardin, appropriate for his position as adviser-secretary to King Louis XIV in the newly conquered territory of Cambrai.) The wealthy industrialist Auguste Legrand had just bequeathed the building to the city to present the collections of the municipal museum, and the living rooms were appropriate for this function. The new museum, designed by the architect Veret, was inaugurated in the spring of 1893. The transfer of the museum to the Hôtel de Francqueville led to new acquisitions from the State and a series of donations. The most important was that of Ernest Delloye who donated the former collection of Mgr Belmas which had been entrusted to him (about two hundred objects: bronzes, art objects, porcelain, jewellery, paintings, etc.) and his own collection of a considerable number of documents and objects relating to the history of Cambrai.

During the First World War, the building was partially damaged and the museum lost much of its collections: in March 1918, a bomb ripped open the roof and floors of the first floor and cracked the walls. One hundred and seventy-three paintings, eight sculptures and almost the entire Belmas collection were destroyed. In 1924 part of the museum was reopened, with an acquisition policy favouring artists from northern France who had won prizes at the Salon des artistes français before the war. The entire museum was reopened on 14 May 1933. The contents of the museum were completely evacuated for safeguarding following the declaration of the Second World War. The museum was subsequently reopened in two stages: the first in August 1946, the second a year later.

Renovated and enlarged between 1989 and 1994 by the architects Jean-François Bodin and Thierry Germe, the Cambrai museum now integrates contemporary architectural design. The museum was redesigned and renovated again in 2018, and the collection was rehung. The collections are spread over four levels in a chronological route from prehistory to 20th century art.

== Curators ==
Start date	End date	Curator
1884	1892	Achille Durieux
1892	1898	Édouard Gautier
1898	1917	Émile Mussault
1919	1921	Jules Renaut
1921	1928	Georges Leboyer
1927	1933	Georges Maroniez
1934	1952	Ernest Gaillard
1952	1962	Gérard Bayle
1964	1987	Michel Bouvy
1987	2001	Françoise Magny
2001	2010	Véronique Burnod
2011	2014	Maël Bellec
2014	2022	Alice Cornier
2023		Franck de Frias

== Collections ==
=== Archaeological Department ===
Archaeological collections are displayed inn the two underground levels of the museum. Great importance is given to local collections, particularly those from the Merovingian period, which are especially rich due to excavations on Rue des Vignes. These allow the presentation of the history of the occupation of the Cambrai region.

The museum also holds two collections outside of this local archaeology. The first is a collection of Etruscan pieces, including a sarcophagus, from the Campana collection. The second is an osteoarchaeology section, unique in France, which presents evidence provided by human remains to help understand the lives of these people and their environment.

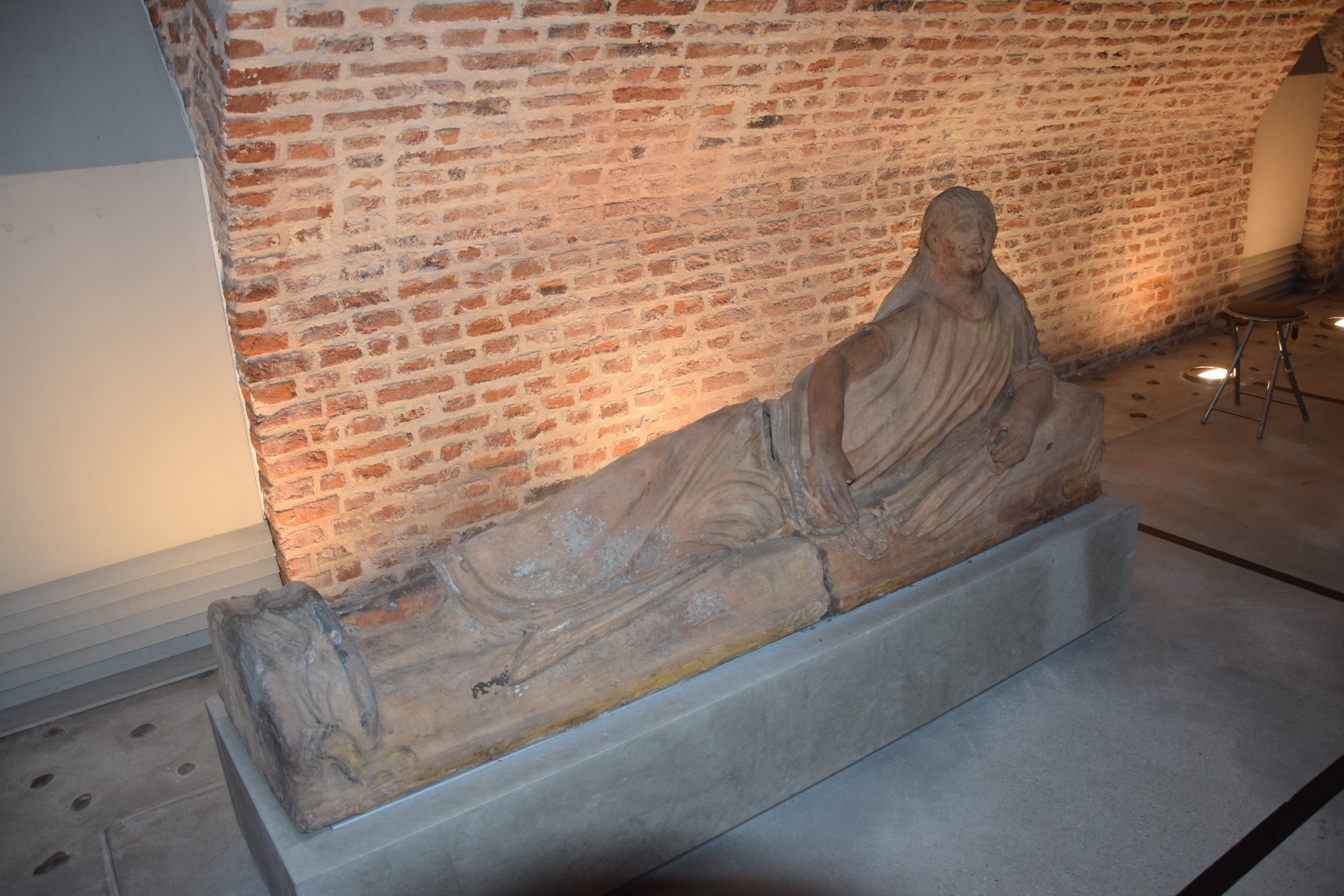
Etruscan collection

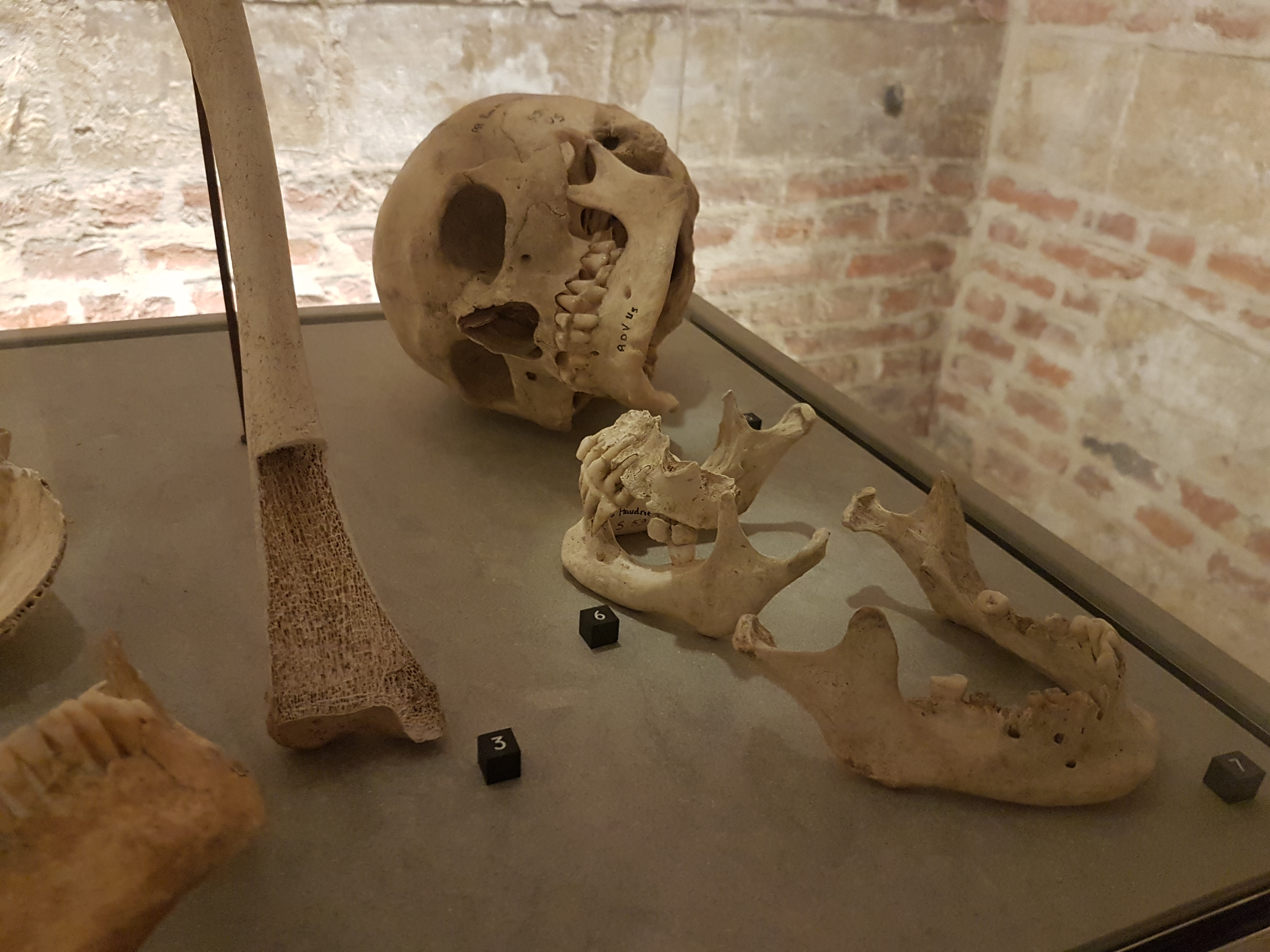
Osteoarchaeology collection

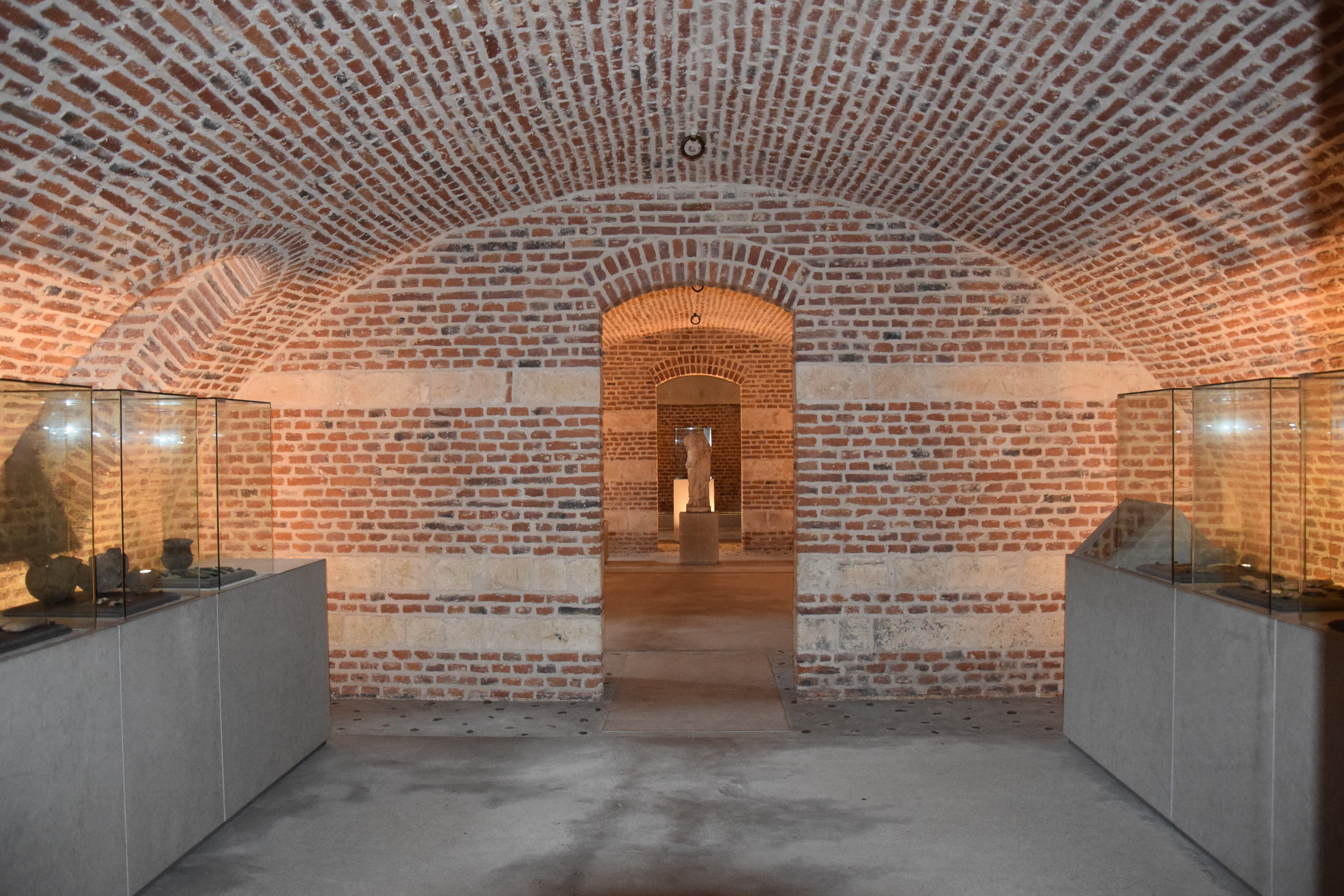
Local archaeology collection

=== Heritage Department ===
This section allows visitors to immerse themselves in the history of the city and discover its evolution from the 12th to the 18th century. It displays objects and architectural remains that testify to Cambrai’s historical wealth and significance.

In this exhibit, the first section presents ancient architectural elements of Cambrai, such as those from the churches of Cambrésis, like the former Cambrai Cathedral or Honnecourt Church. Three column statues, likely from the former Saint Géry Church, are the most important pieces in this space. These elements are witnesses to Cambrai during the Romanesque period, before the fire that ravaged the city in the 12th century. From this period comes a remarkable depiction of Pyramus and Thisbe.

The second section of this department is dedicated to the former cathedral of the city, nicknamed the "wonder of the Netherlands". It explores this architecture and features portraits of important bishops of Cambrai such as François Fénelon and Van der Burch. This space houses alabaster sculptures from the former cathedral.

The third section focuses on Cambrai in the 18th century after its annexation by France. The most spectacular object here is the procession carriage of the canonesses of Sainte-Aldegonde, dating from the 18th century. It was used for the processions of Sainte-Aldegonde in Maubeuge, a unique piece in French collections and a trace of a now-lost ephemeral heritage. The painting The Capture of Cambrai by Louis XIV in 1677 by Adam Frans van der Meulen illustrates this major episode in Cambrai's history.

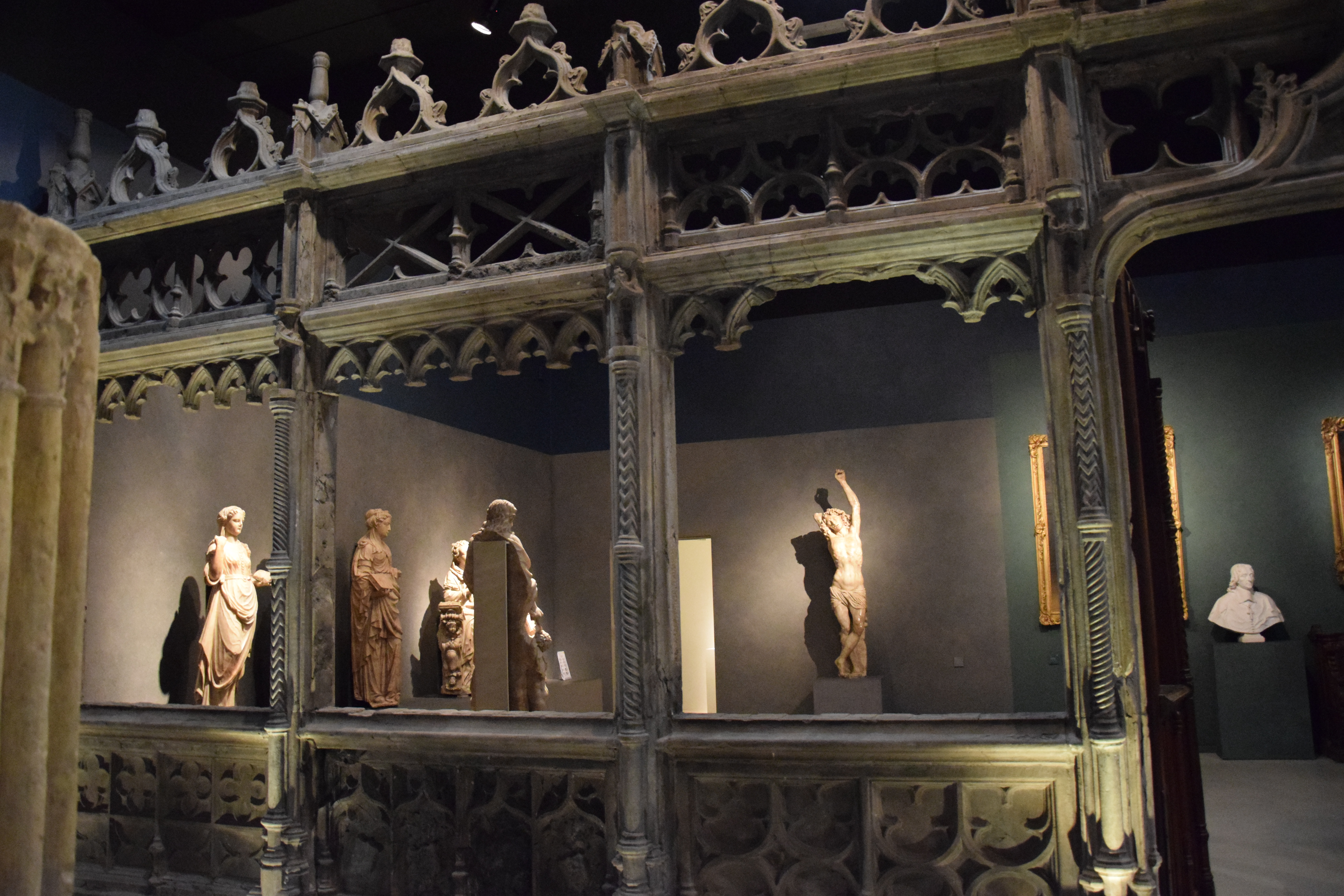
Sculptures from old churches

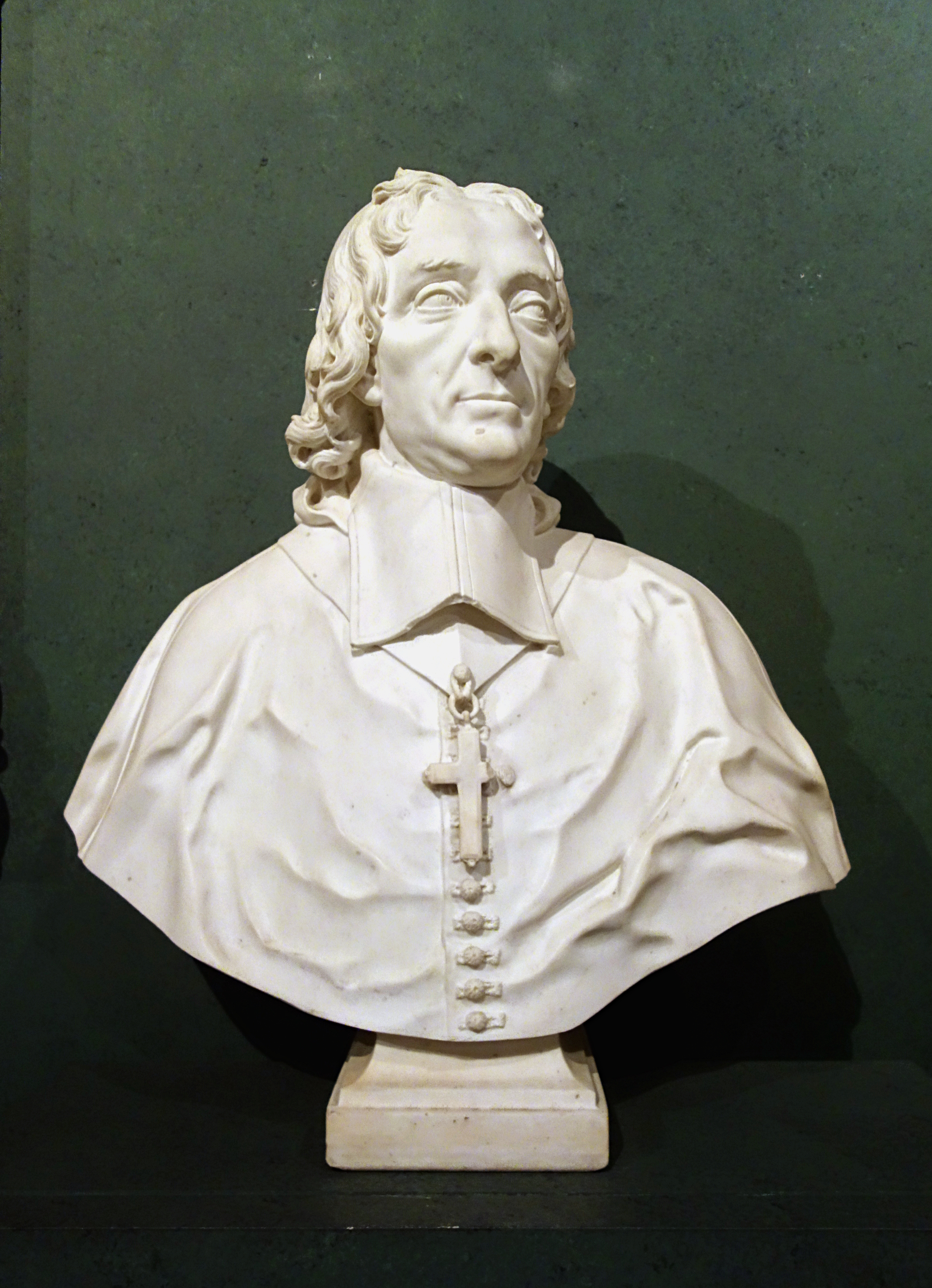
Sculpture of François Fénelon

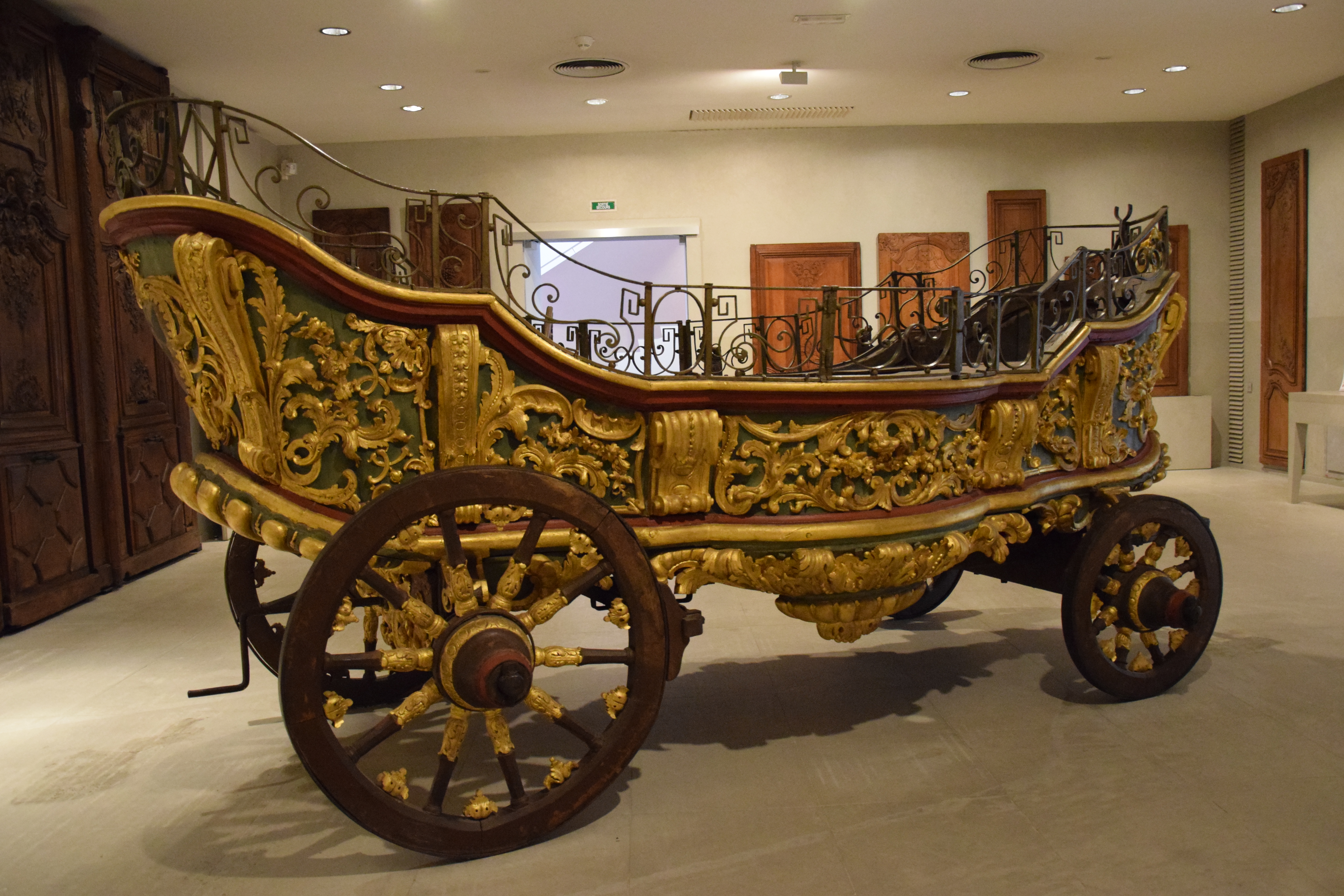
Carriage of Sainte Aldegonde

=== Fine Arts and Modern Art Department ===
This section, showcasing works from the 16th to the 21st century, was renovated in 2018 to highlight the theme of the body in the collections. It is housed in a mansion where the original décor remains visible. It features 17th-century Flemish and Dutch painters, including David Teniers the Younger, Theodoor Rombouts, Joos de Momper, Frans Francken the Younger, Bartholomeus van der Helst, Adam Frans van der Meulen, as well as 19th- and 20th-century artists such as Dominique Ingres, Théodore Chassériau, Eugène Boudin, Camille Claudel, Auguste Rodin, Antoine Bourdelle, François Pompon, Auguste Herbin, Maurice Utrillo, Kees van Dongen, Sonia Delaunay, Suzanne Valadon, Victor Vasarely, Henri Le Sidaner, Geneviève Claisse, Guy de Lussigny, and others.

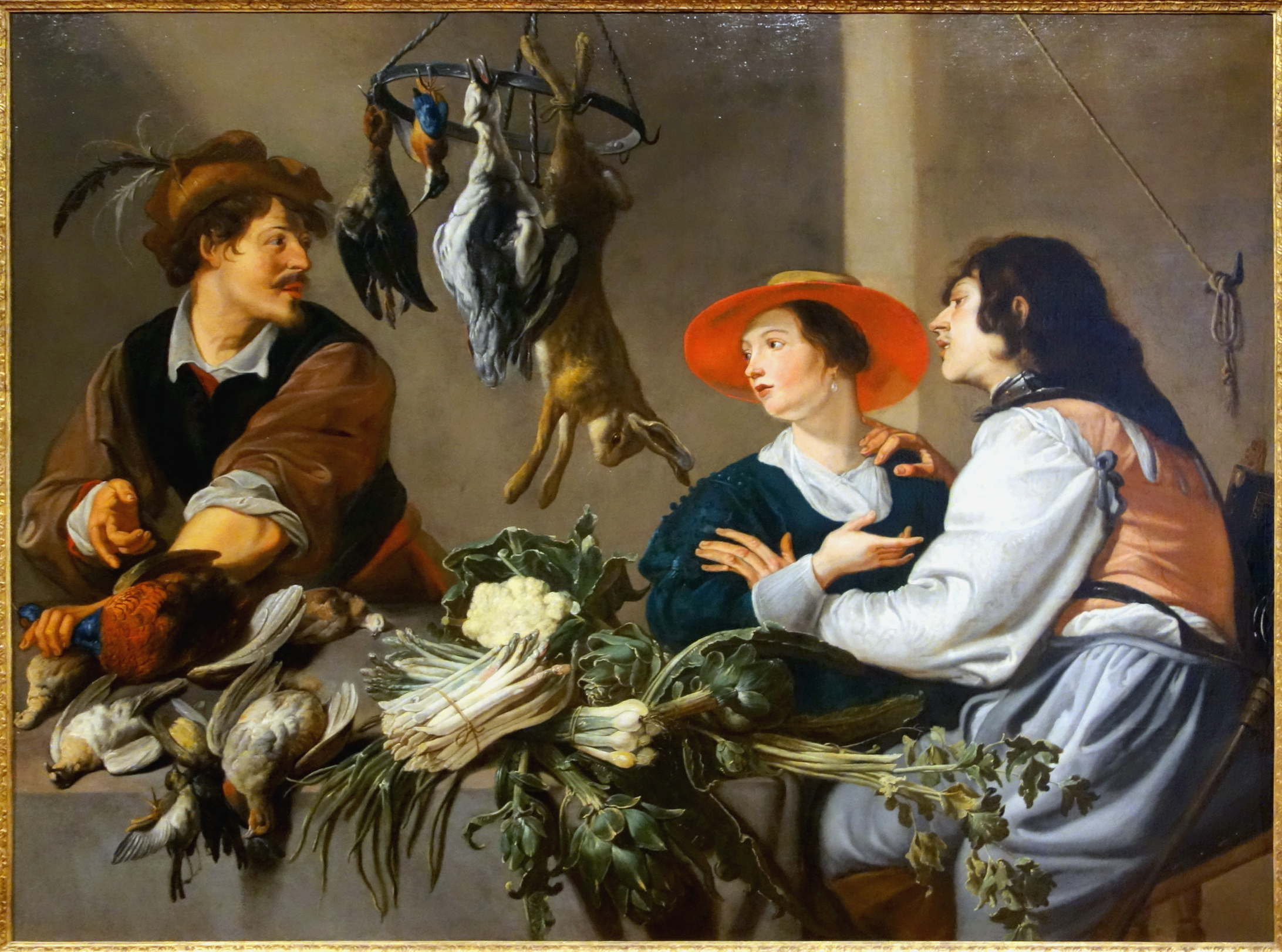
Theodoor Rombouts, The Game and Vegetable Merchant, 17th century

Frans Francken the Younger, The Parable of the Rich Man and Lazarus, 17th century

Pierre-Alexandre Wille, The Last Moments of a Beloved Wife, 1784

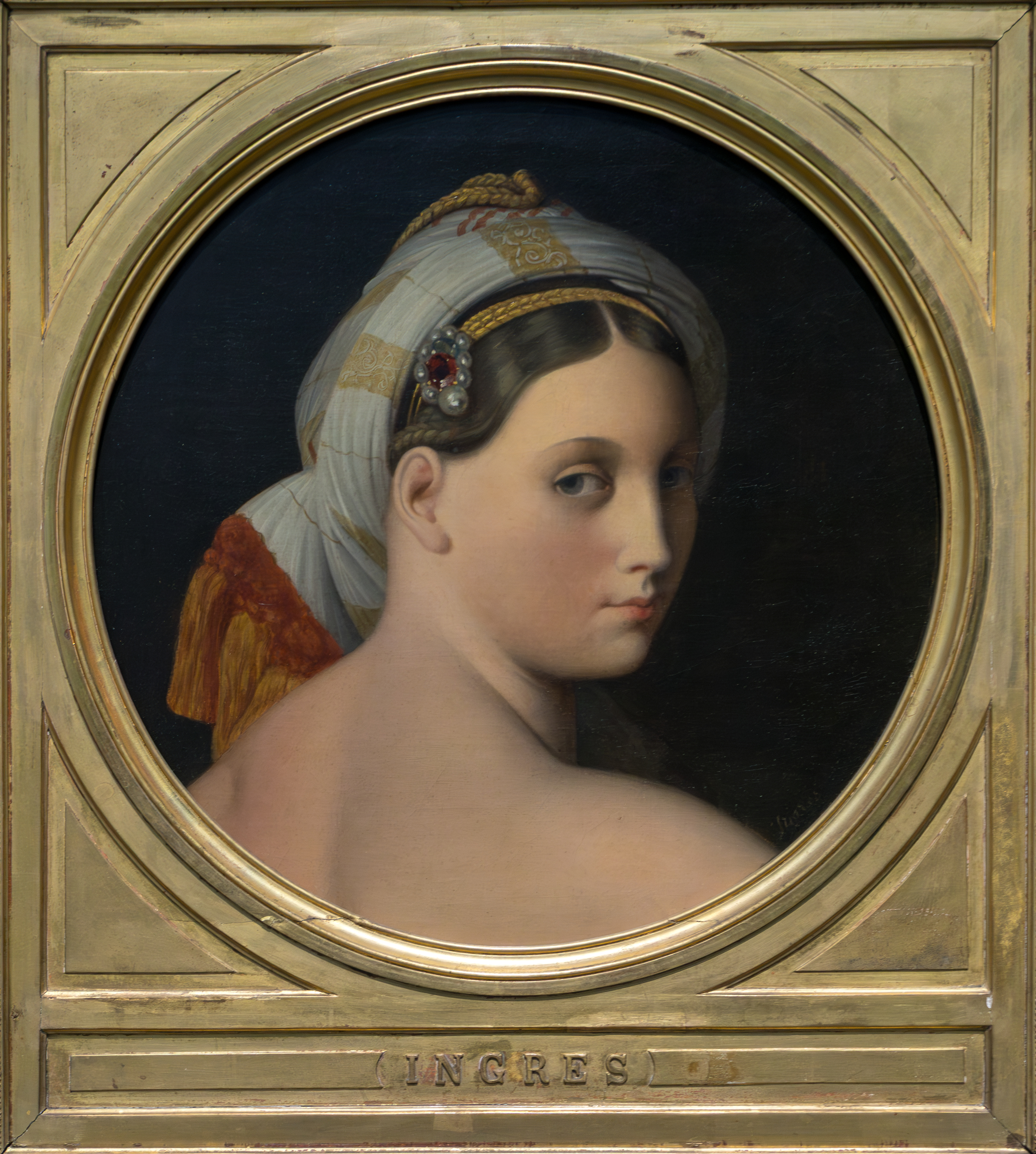
Jean Auguste Dominique Ingres, Head of Large Reclining Odalisque, 1814-1816

Ary Scheffer, Christ with the Reed, 1857

Auguste Rodin, Saint John the Baptist Preaching, 1877

James Tissot, The Older Sister, 1881

Henri Pluchart, Fieldwork in Artois, 1891

Jules Breton, Portrait of Madame Dorchain, 1897

Antoine Villard, Snowballs, 1914

== Works ==
=== Painting ===
- Workshop of Hyacinthe Rigaud, Portrait of Louis XIV, 17th century, oil on canvas.
- Jan Miel, Aeneas and Dido Hunting, 17th century, oil on canvas.
- Jean-Auguste-Dominique Ingres, Head of Large Reclining Odalisque, 19th century, oil on canvas.
- Carolus-Duran, Full-length Portrait of the Marquise d'Anforti, 1873, oil on canvas.
- Louis Marie De Schryver, The Merchant of Four Seasons.
- Suzanne Valadon, Madame Lévy, 1922, oil on canvas.
- Kees van Dongen, Madame Jeanne Mathis, 1968, oil on canvas.
- Henri Malvaux, Landscape, 20th century, oil on canvas.
- Clémentine Hélène Dufau, Portrait of Countess Anna de Noailles, 1914, oil on canvas.
- Henri Le Sidaner, The Closed Shutters, Gerberoy, 1935, oil on wood.

=== Sculpture ===
- Théophile Bra, Pierre de Francqueville, Sculptor of Henri IV, 1825, white marble bust.
- Jean-Baptiste Carpeaux, Young Girl with a Shell, 1864, bronze statue.
- Auguste Rodin, Saint John the Baptist Preaching, or the Man of the Desert, 1879, plaster statue.
- Auguste Rodin, Victor Hugo, 1883, plaster bust.
- Antoine Bourdelle, Bust of Anatole France, early 20th century.
- Auguste Rodin, Saint John the Baptist Preaching, 1877.

== Bibliography ==
- Couturier, Emmanuelle (1 May 2009). Musées de France en Nord et Pas-de-Calais: Terre d'arts et de cultures (in French). La Voix du Nord. ISBN 978-2843931321.
- Magny, Françoise (30 June 1997). Le Musée de Cambrai (in French). Paris: Réunion des Musées Nationaux. ISBN 978-2711835850.
- Wiard, Laurent; Deschamps, Stéphanie; Deloffre, Véronique; Hanotte, Alice (15 May 2007). Nord, Terre de création : Chefs-d'oeuvre des musées du Nord - Pas-de-Calais (in French). Illustria Librairie des musées. ISBN 978-2912241115.
- Heurs et malheurs du Musée de Cambrai (Musée de Cambrai ed.). 1 January 2012.
