= Matisse Museum =

Matisse Museum may refer to the following museums in France:

- Matisse Museum (Le Cateau)
- Musée Matisse (Nice)
