= Musée Matisse =

Musée Matisse may refer to:

- Matisse Museum (Le Cateau)
- Musée Matisse (Nice)
