= Geneviève Claisse =

French painter

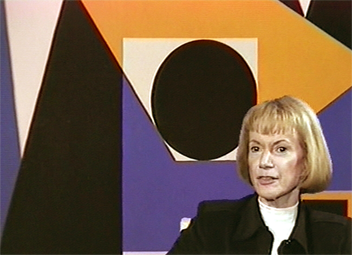
- Claisse in 1995
- Born: 17 July 1935; Quiévy, France
- Died: 30 April 2018 (aged 82); Dreux, France
- Known for: Painting

Geneviève Claisse (French pronunciation: [ʒənvjɛv klɛs]; 17 July 1935 – 30 April 2018) was a French geometrical abstract painter.

A relative to Auguste Herbin, her painting vocation was born through reading the magazine Art d'aujourd'hui, tribune of geometrical abstraction.

Claisse was the great niece of abstract painter Auguste Herbin, a founder of the Parisian association of artists Abstraction-Création. Herbin saw Claisse's work for the first time when she was eighteen years old, and encouraged her to continue painting. In Herbin's mind, Claisse was "le successeur désigné par le destin et par l'hérédité" ("the successor appointed by destiny and heredity"). Like Herbin, Claisse's work shows a devotion to the ideals of formal purity and the perfection of execution. At this young age she worked tirelessly, often working at night after a day in the studio, carefully painting abstract forms on bold, colorful canvases.

== Chronology ==
- 1958 - First personal exhibits in the Galerie Caille in Cambrai and Galerie Hybler in Paris.
- 1959 - Moves to Paris and shares a studio with Herbin.
- 1961 - First exhibit in the Galerie Denise René in Paris where she will regularly exhibit in the following years.
- 1967 - Museum of fine arts of La Chaux-de-Fonds. Biennale de Paris.
- 1968 - "Art optique" at the museum of fine arts of Oslo.
- 1970 - Paris: Claisse, Galerie Denise René.
- 1971 - Amsterdam: Claisse, Galerie d'Eendt.
- 1972 - Modern art center of Alençon.
- 1978 - Paris: Claisse, Concepts multilinéaires, Galerie Denise René.
- 1981 - Paris: Claisse, Geneviève Claisse, Galerie Denise René.
- 1983 - Palais des Beaux-Arts de Lille.
- 1989 - Musée Matisse du Cateau-Cambrésis (permanent collection).

In 1965, she focused her work on color (Cercles, ADN).
