= Guy de Lussigny =

French painter

Guy de Lussigny (30 August 1929 in Cambrai, northern France – 14 July 2001 in Paris) was a French painter of the school of geometric abstraction.

== Career ==
Guy de Lussigny started painting in 1950. At first a figurative painter, he soon followed in the footsteps of Mondrian and Malevich. A pivotal encounter with Gino Severini, a founder of the Italian Futurist movement, occurred in 1955: Severini encouraged Lussigny to pursue his chosen path in geometric abstraction. The straight line, square format and colour came to dominate Lussingy's work. In 1956, he met the painter Auguste Herbin, a meeting which turned out to be equally significant for him. Both artists took liberties with colour theory, thereby multiplying their possibilities. The gallerist Colette Allendy organised Lussigny's first individual exhibition in Paris in 1959. Thereafter he exhibited regularly in France, throughout Europe and Japan.

In 1967 Lussigny settled permanently in Paris and participated in a number of salons, among them 'Grands et jeunes d'aujourd'hui', 'Salon des réalités nouvelles' and 'Salon comparaisons'. From 1969 to 1975, he worked with Denise René in Paris and New York. 1974 marked his third important encounter, with the Italian painter Antonio Calderara, and they became fast friends. Friendship with artists ("my colleagues") was a key element in his life, notably that of the German sculptor Hans Steinbrenner, the Italian sculptor Francesco Marino Di Teana and the painter Antoine de Margerie.

Lussigny had a university degree in history and was an accomplished pianist.

== Work ==
Guy de Lussigny's painting, pure and precise, conjures a poetic feeling. The square becomes, for the artist, "the most harmonious shape of human invention", while the line is "a precise rendition of mathematical reasoning". With these elements, Lussigny creates a pictorial language with the aim of achieving "a kind of perfection". In 1968, the Institut de France and the Académie des Beaux-Arts awarded him the Prix Dumas-Millier.

His works can be found in numerous public collections and museums in Valenciennes, Montbeliard, the Fondation Calderara, Fnac, Frac Ile de France, Macon, Mondriaanhuis, Musée Tavet-Delacour de Pontoise, Musée Matisse du Cateu-Cambrésis and, especially, in the Musée des Beaux-Arts de Cambrai, with 120 works from the André Le Bozec donation.

== Quotes ==
"Lussigny, who also drew tapestry cartoons, used pure abstraction, painting monochrome backgrounds on which float elementary geometric shapes, for the most part the square and line. Searching for balance and a subtle harmony, his works lend themselves to meditation", according to an analysis by the Galerie Gimpel & Muller in Paris, which mounts regular exhibitions of Lussigny.

"Working in the context of the Neoplastic movement, Guy de Lussigny developed a geometric style which he has pursued with unfailing rigour. To attain a new pictorial reality, his intuitive and empirical language makes use of colour" (Lydia Harambourg).

"Around Guy de Lussigny's paintings there is a mystery. It's like the murmured account of a private adventure which is almost mystical. He need only render the simplest of geometric shapes -the square- and juggle the slenderest of chromatic contrasts, to expand his pictorial works and launch them into a veritable universe where it is less a matter of seeking satisfaction in another sphere than it is to find oneself grounded in that self-same universe." (Frédéric Vitoux of the Académie française). Vitoux, friend and admirer of the artist, wrote this on the occasion of his exhibition at Galerie Gimpel & Muller in 2008.

== Individual exhibitions ==
- 1959 : Galerie Colette Allendy, Paris;
- 1974 : Studio Vigevano, Italy;
- 1975 : Galerie Annick Gendron, Paris;
- 1977 : Galerie Contini, Rome - Galerie Christiane Colin, Paris;
- 1979 : La Galerie, Charleroi, Belgium;
- 1983 : Galerie Art Stable, Amsterdam;
- 1985, 1993 : Galerie Olivier Nouvellet, Paris;
- 1986 : Musée Tavet-Delacour de Pontoise, France
- 1994 : Galerie Claude Dorval, Paris;
- 1995 : Treffpunkt Kunst, Saarlouis, Germany;
- 1998 et 2000 : Galerie Victor Sfez, Paris;
- 2000 : Musée des Ursulines de Mâcon, France
- 2001 : Musée des Beaux-Arts de Cambrai, France
- 2003 et 2008 : Galerie Gudrun Spielvogel, Munich;
- 2009 : Chapelle du Théâtre de Cambrai, France;
- 2010 : Musée des Beaux-Arts de Cambrai - Médiathèque de Cambrai - Galerie Gimpel & Müller, Paris
- 2011 : Galerie Gimpel fils, London

== Group exhibitions ==
- 2008 : Galerie Gimpel & Müller, Paris
- 2009 : Gimpel fils (London)

== Public collections ==
- Musée de Valenciennes, (France)
- FNAC, Fonds national d'art contemporain (France)
- FRAC Ile de France, (France)
- Fondation Freundlich, (France)
- Amis du Centre Pompidou, Paris
- Mobilier National, Paris
- Musée de Mâcon, (France)
- Mondriaanhuis (Netherland),
- Musée Chelmskie (Poland),
- Musée des Beaux-Arts de Cambrai, (France)
- Musée du Cateau-Cambrésis, (France)
- Musée Satoru Sato (Japan),
- Lieu d'Art et d'Action Contemporaine de Dunkerque, (France)
- Musée de Waldenbuch (Germany),
- Musée de Pontoise (France)

== Bibliography ==
- « Spazio e colore di Guy de Lussigny », G. Franzoso et J. Lassaigne, Cat. expo, Studio V, Vigevano (Italy), 1974
- « G. de Lussigny, Traversée des apparences », Catalogue. expo, F. Vitoux, Otto Hahn et autres, Ed. ACD Productions, Paris, 1981
- « Peinture 1977-2000 », Cat. expo, Musée des Ursulines, Mâcon, France, 2000
- « Collection André Le Bozec », V. Burnod et N. Surlapierre, Petit journal du Musée de Cambrai, Cambrai, (France), 2003
- « L’Abstraction géométrique vécue », cat. Musée de Cambrai, (France), 2007
- « Art construit- Art concret », cat. Musée de Cambrai, (France), 2007
- « Lussigny - rétrospective 1952-2001 La couleur à travers le temps », catalogue Musée de Cambrai 2010, édité grâce au mécénat d'André Le Bozec
- " L'abstraction géométrique au Musée de Cambrai. Rencontre entre un peintre et un collectionneur ". Une chronique d'exposition de Gunilla Lapointe. February 2004
