= Boussières-en-Cambrésis =

- Commune
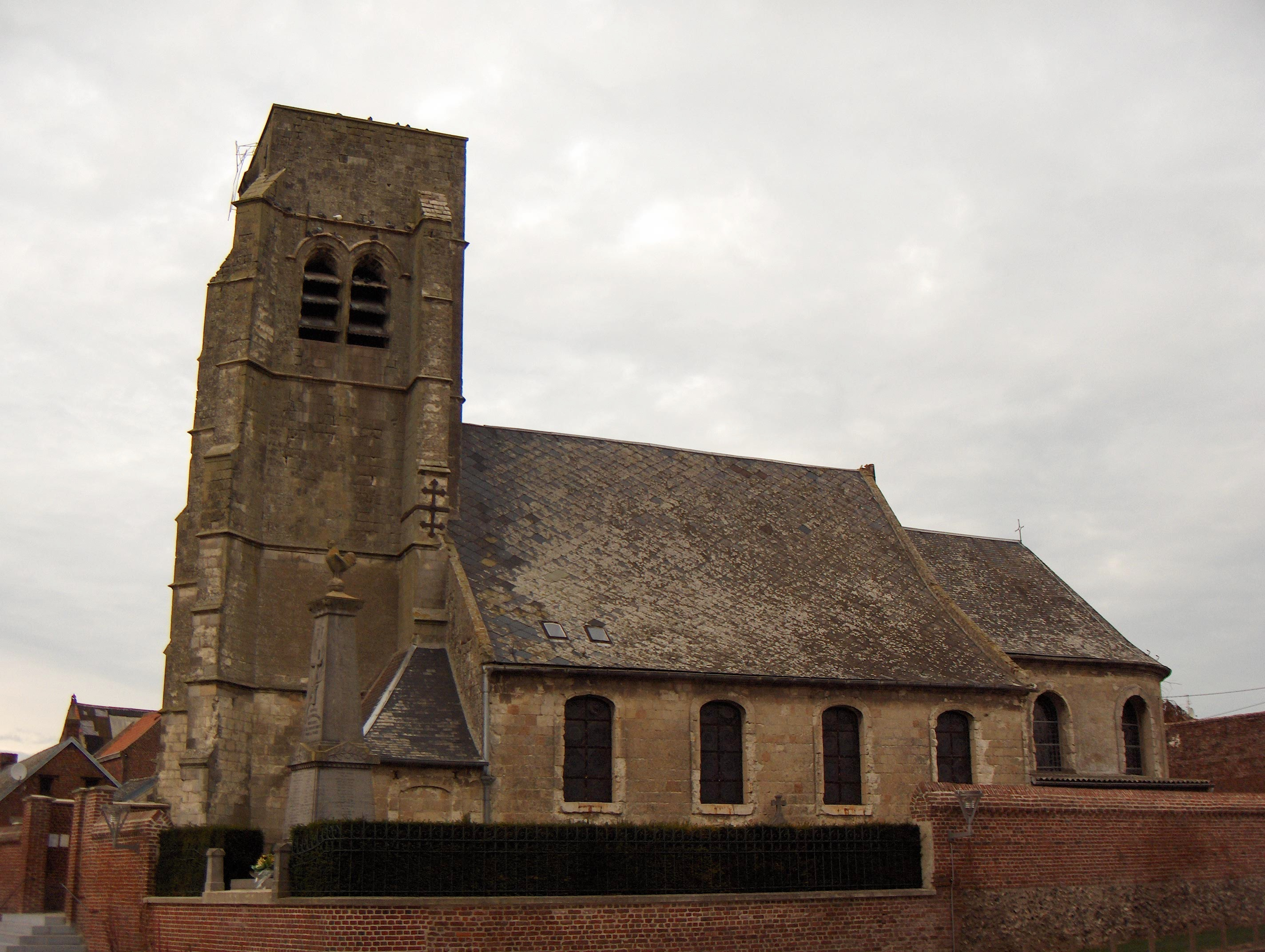
- The church in Boussières-en-Cambrésis

- Coat of arms
- Location of Boussières-en-Cambrésis
- Location within France Location within Hauts-de-France
- Coordinates: 50°09′57″N 3°22′03″E
- Country: France
- Region: Hauts-de-France
- Department: Nord
- Arrondissement: Cambrai
- Canton: Caudry
- Intercommunality: CA Caudrésis–Catésis

Government
  - Mayor (2020–2026): Laurent Loignon
- Area^{1}: 4.82 km^{2} (1.86 sq mi)
- Elevation: 75 m (246 ft)
- Highest elevation: 109 m (358 ft)
- Lowest elevation: 70 m (230 ft)
- Population (2023): 436
  - Density: 90.5/km^{2} (234/sq mi)
- Time zone: UTC+01:00 (CET)
  - Summer (DST): UTC+02:00 (CEST)
- INSEE/Postal code: 59102 /59217
- ^{1} French Land Register data, which excludes lakes, ponds, glaciers > 1 km^{2} (0.386 sq mi or 247 acres) and river estuaries.

Boussières-en-Cambrésis is a commune in the Nord department in northern France.

== Population ==
Historical population
Year	Pop.	±% p.a.
1968	502	—
1975	439	−1.90%
1982	462	+0.73%
1990	458	−0.11%
1999	434	−0.60%
2007	413	−0.62%
2012	426	+0.62%
2017	422	−0.19%
2023	436	+0.55%
Source: INSEE

== Heraldry ==
Arms of Boussières-en-Cambrésis	The arms of Boussières-en-Cambrésis are blazoned : Per fess 1: Azure, a latin cross enfiled of a crown of thorns Or; 2: Gules, 3 fleurs de lys Or. (Boussières-en-Cambrésis, Morenchies and Quiévy use the same arms.)

== See also ==
- Communes of the Nord department
