= Johann Georg Wille =

German-born copper engraver and art dealer (1715–1808)

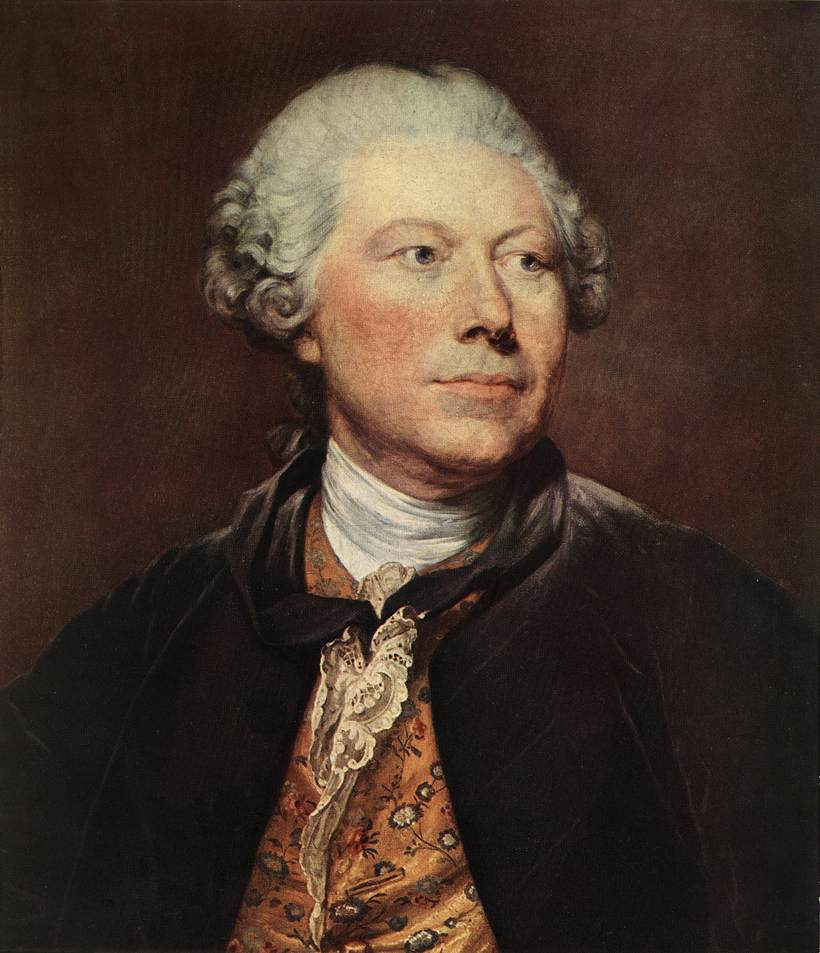
Johann Georg Wille; portrait by Jean-Baptiste Greuze (1763)

Johann Georg Wille, or Jean Georges Wille (5 November 1715, near Biebertal – 5 April 1808, Paris) was a German-born copper engraver, who spent most of his life in France. He also worked as an art dealer.

== Life and work ==
He was the eldest of seven children born to the miller, Johann Philipp Wille, and his wife, Anna Elisabeth née Zimmermann. He showed an early interest in art; drawing birds and the faces of his classmates. He also copied the illustrations from his father's Bible. Initially, he studied mathematics in Giessen, with the intent of attending a university, but his interest in art prevailed and he began taking lessons from a local portrait painter. This proved to be unsuccessful, so he learned engraving instead and worked for a gunsmith, who taught him how to decorate hunting rifles.

In 1736, he travelled as a wandering journeyman through Frankfurt am Main, Worms and Straßburg, among many others, on his way to Paris. During his trip, he met the engraver, Georg Friedrich Schmidt, and the painter, Friedrich Wilhelm Hoeder, and all three travelled together. He lived there with Schmidt, for several years, until he was accepted at the Académie Royale de Peinture et de Sculpture. During his wait, he decorated rifle stocks and engraved watches.

His talent was noticed by the publisher, Michel Odieuvre, who hired him to create nineteen illustrations for his book, L'Europe illustre, contenant l'histoire abrégée des souverains, des princes, des prélats, des ministres, des grands capitaines, des magistrats, des savans, des artistes, & des dames célèbres en Europe, a job for which he was poorly paid. From 1742, he worked for the engraver, Jean Daullé. In 1747, he married Marie Louise Deforges (d.1785). Their son, Pierre Alexandre, became a genre painter.

His engravings of portraits by Nicolas de Largillière attracted the attention of Hyacinthe Rigaud, who commissioned him to create portraits of his wife and Marshal Louis-Charles-Auguste Fouquet de Belle-Isle. These works were what finally established him as a sought-after artist. Many famous painters began to entrust him with creating engravings of their portraits. After acquiring French citizenship, he was designated as an "Engraver to the King". From 1753, he operated an engraving school, where he taught drawing from nature and employed nude models. In 1761, he became a member of the Académie. He also provided engravings for the courts of Denmark and the Holy Roman Empire. Through these clients, and his art dealing, he amassed a considerable fortune, which enabled him to turn his attention from portraits to whatever caught his fancy.

Although he had an impressive art collection, he lost most of his belongings during the French Revolution. In 1793, a cannon was fired too close to his head and he lost his hearing. As a result, he was named a Knight in the Legion of Honor. He also gradually became blind. Efforts to support himself by selling his earlier works failed, as all of his previous clients and collectors were struggling to get by. He died, impoverished, at the age of ninety-three.

== Selected works ==
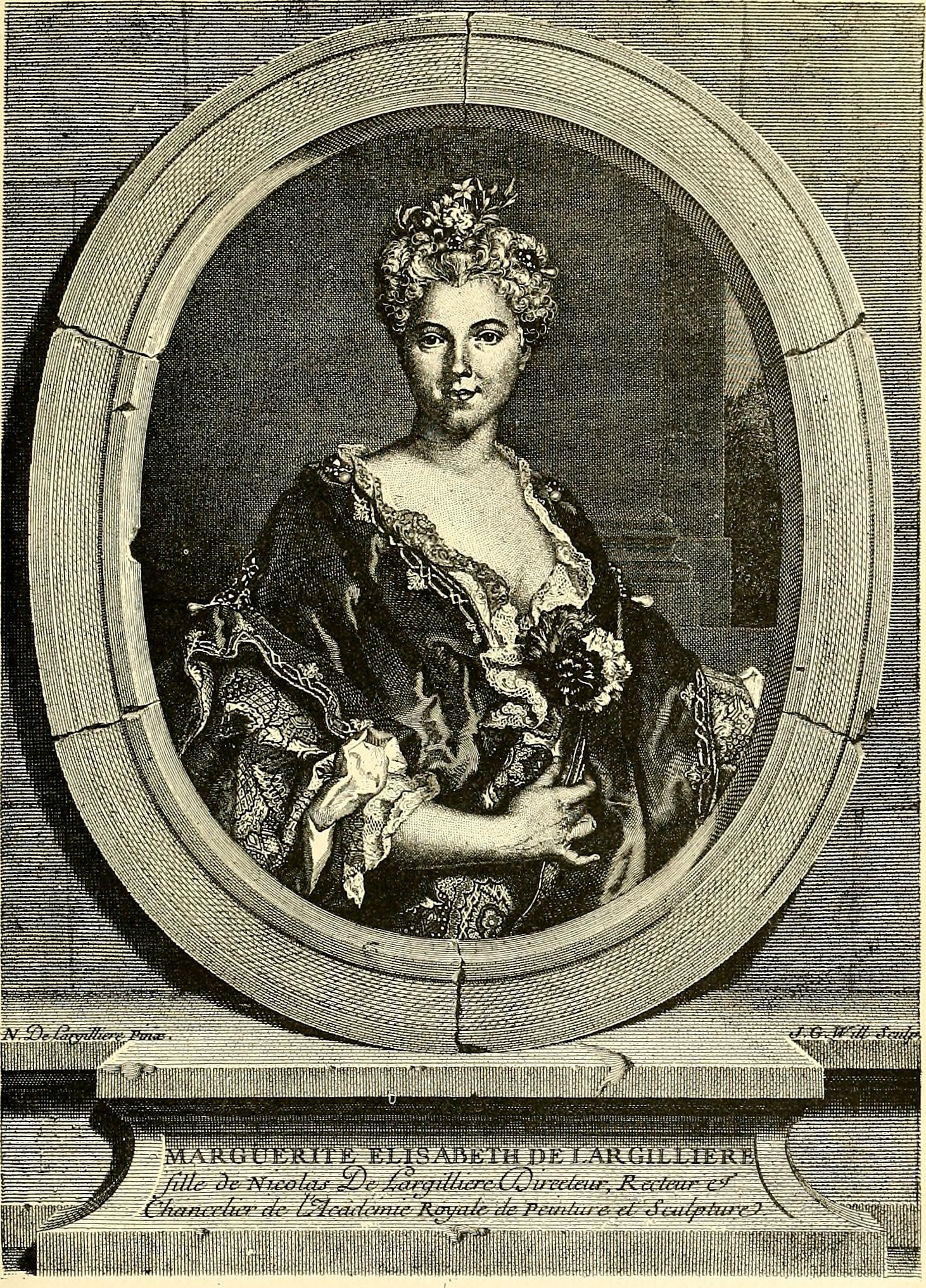
Marguerite Élisabeth de Largillière; after Nicolas de Largillière

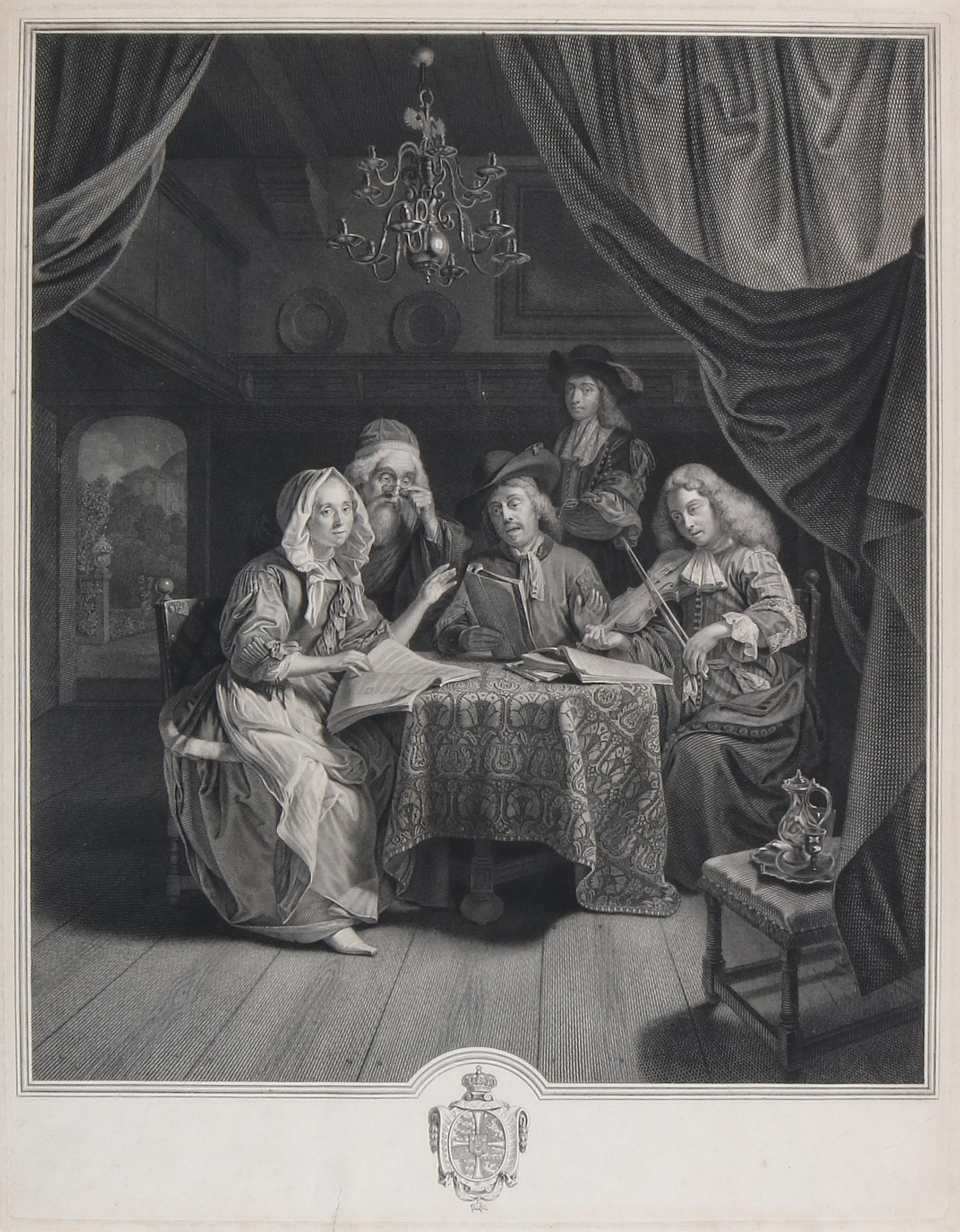
The Family Concert; after Godfried Schalcken

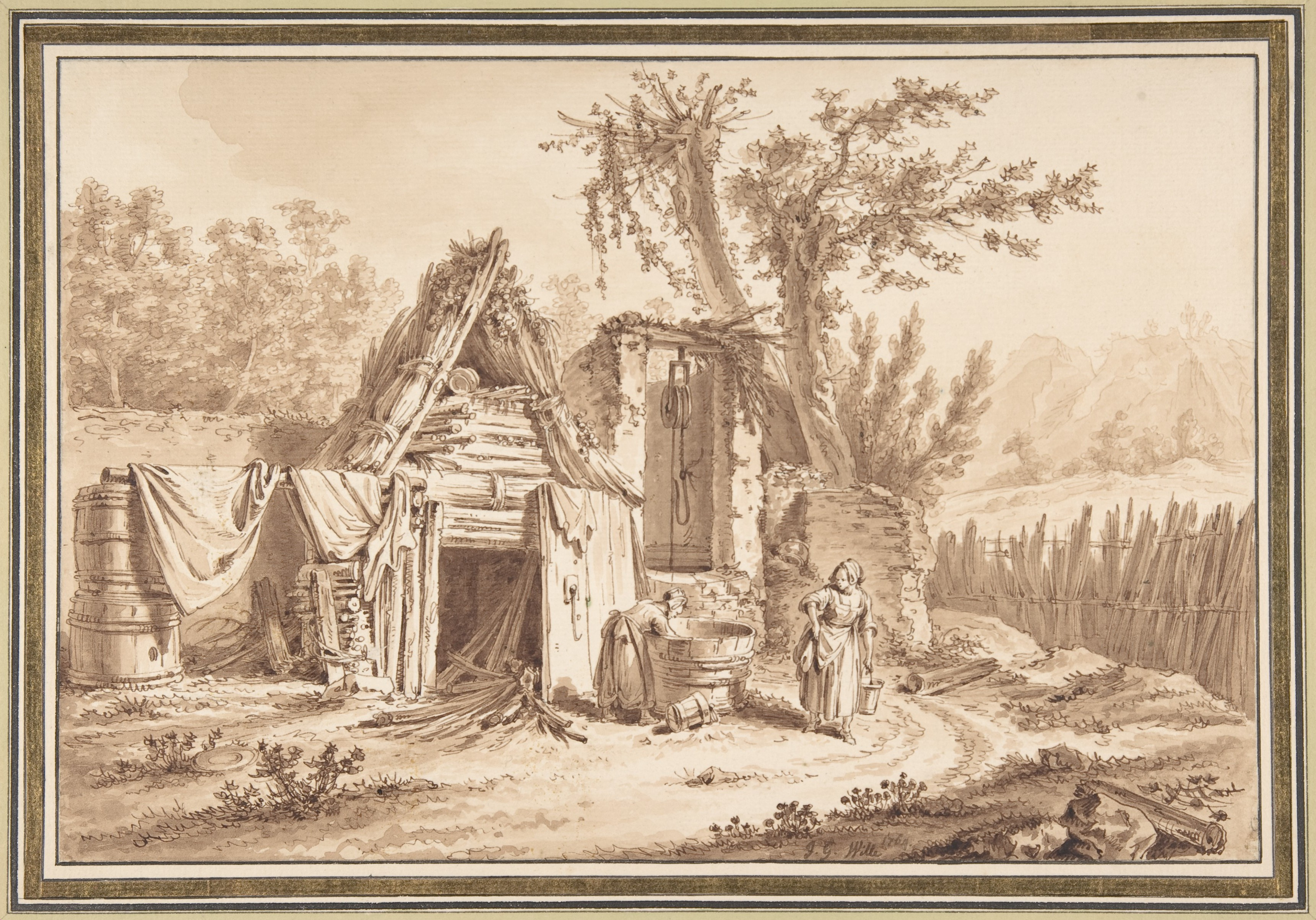
Washerwomen in Front of a Cottage

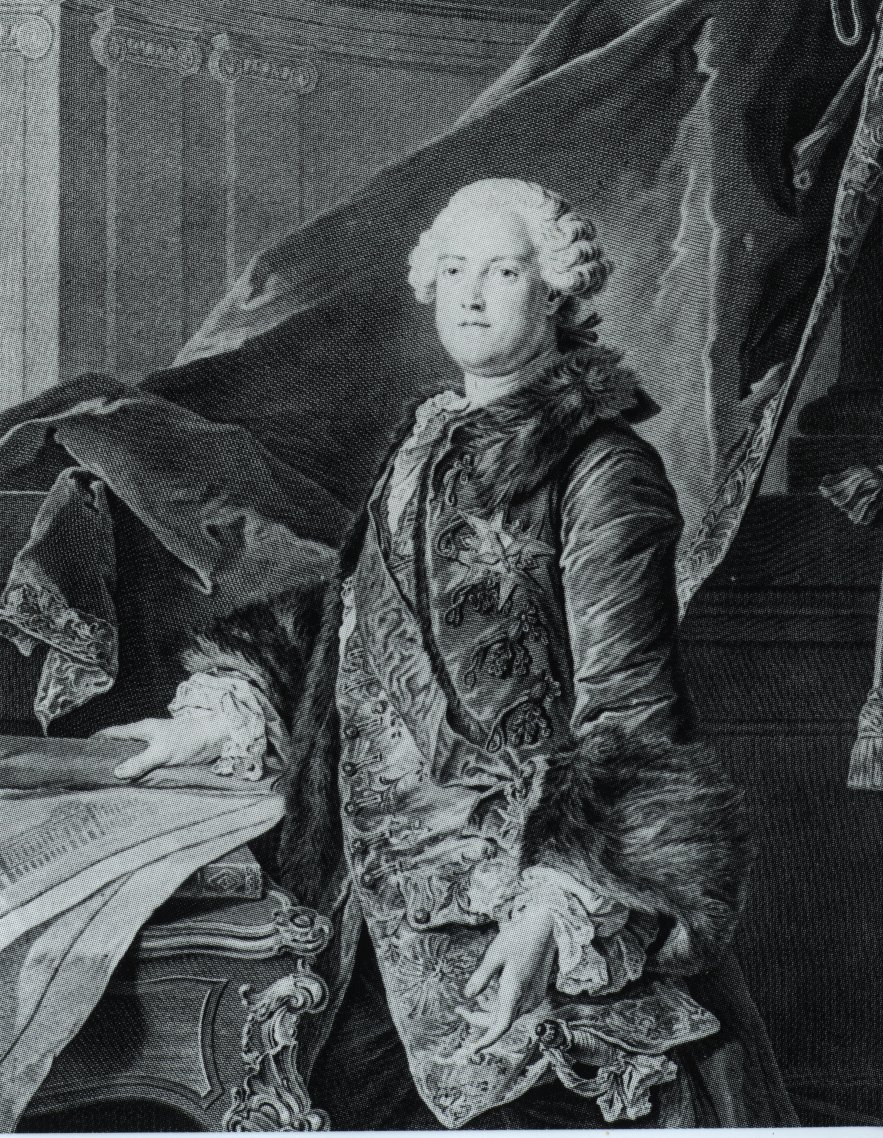
The Marquis de Marigny; after Louis Tocqué

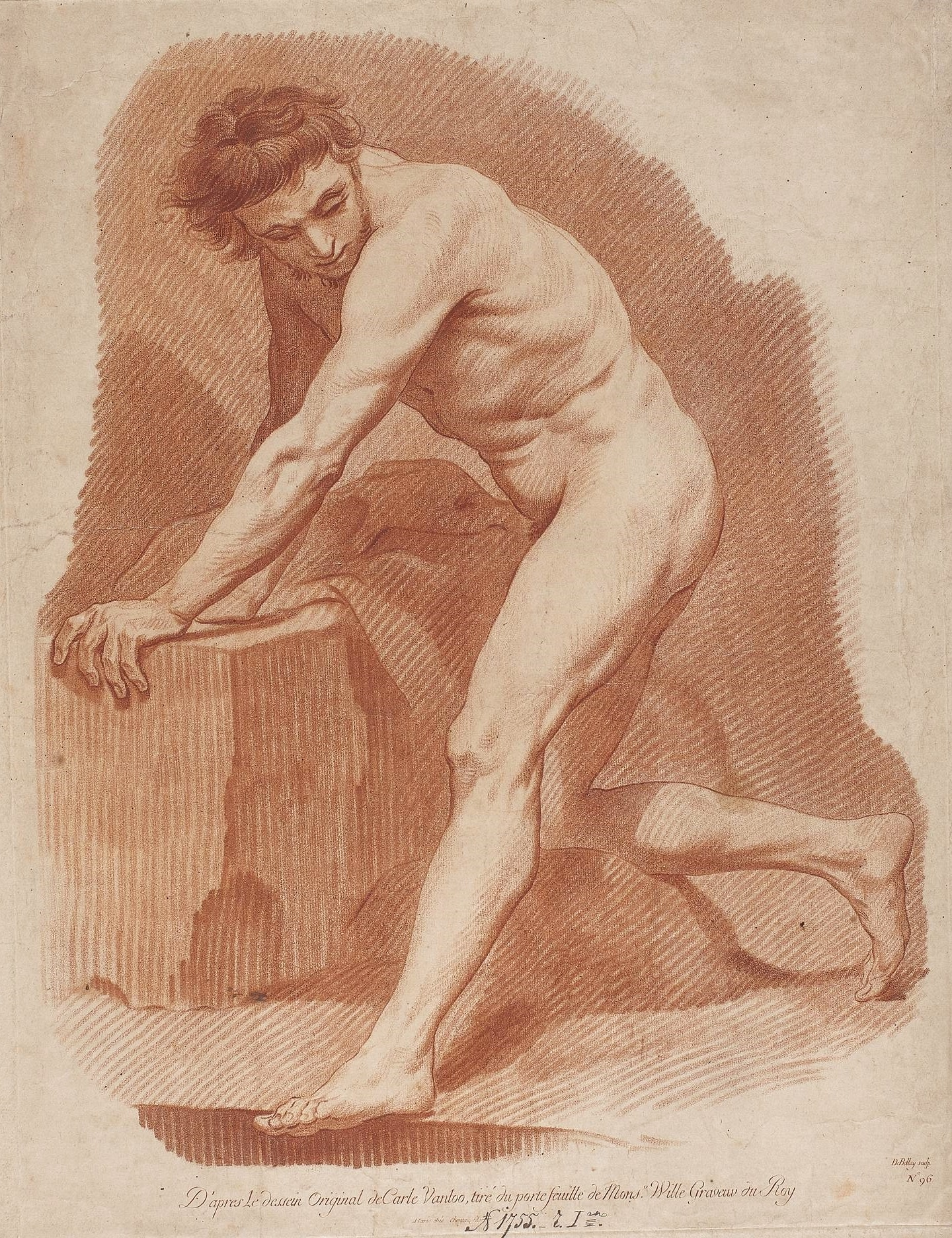
Nude Man on One Knee

== Sources ==
- Charles Le Blanc: Catalogue de l’œuvre de Jean Georges Wille, graveur, avec une notice biographique. Weigel, Leipzig 1847 (Online).
- Georg Kaspar Nagler: Neues Allgemeine Künstler Lexicon oder Nachrichten von dem Leben und den Werken der Maler, Bildhauer, Baumeister, Kupferstecher, Formschneider, Lithographen, Zeichner, Medailleure, Elfenbeinarbeiter, etc. Vol.21, Verlag E. A. Fleischmann, Munich, 1851, pp.465–496 (Online).
- Georges Duplessis: Mémoires et journal de J.-G. Wille. Graveur du Roi. D'après les manuscrits autographes de la Bibliothèque Impériale, 2 Vols., Jules Renouard, Paris 1857 (Online Vol.1, Vol.2)

- The autobiography of the early years of the world-famous John George Wille, „graveur du roi“. Translated from the French by Alfred Roffe. Somers Town, London 1872 (Online).
- Die Memoiren des Kupferstechers Jean Georges Wille (1715–1808) übersetzt nach Georges Duplessis. Deutsche Übersetzung von Herbert Krüger und Peter Merck. In: Mitteilungen des Oberhessischen Geschichtsvereins 51, 1966, pp.36–74 (Vol.1) und 52, 1967, pp.79–130 (Vol.2)

- Wilhelm Schmidt (1898). "Wille, Johann Georg" . Allgemeine Deutsche Biographie (in German). Vol. 43. Leipzig: Duncker & Humblot. pp. 257–260.
- Wolf Erich Kellner: Neues aus dem schriftlichen Nachlaß des Jean Georges Wille. In: Mitteilungen des Oberhessischen Geschichtsvereins Band 49–50, 1965, S. 144–184 (Online)
- Hein-Thomas Schulze Altcappenberg: „Le Voltaire de l'art“. Johann Georg Wille (1715–1808) und seine Schule in Paris. Studien zur Künstler- und Kunstgeschichte der Aufklärung. Lit-Verlag, Münster 1987, ISBN 3-88660-363-6
- Élisabeth Décultot (Ed.): Johann Georg Wille (1715-1808) et son milieu. Un réseau européen de l’art au XVIIIe siècle. Actes du colloque Paris 19 et 20 janvier 2007. École du Louvre, Paris 2009, ISBN 978-2-904187-25-4
