= Philippe Richard (artist) =

French painter

- Born: 25 February 1962 (age 64)
- Occupation: Painter

Philippe Richard (born February 25, 1962) is a French artist, based in Paris, France. He lived New York from 1996 to 1999. He has been very close to some American painters such as Joan Mitchell and Shirley Jaffe. Some of his work resides in the Theodore Art in Brooklyn, New York.

== Biography ==
Richard studied painting at the School of the Art Institute of Paris (École nationale supérieure des Beaux-Arts). From 1994 to 1996 he did a residency at Straumur Art Commune in Iceland. From 1994 to 1995 he received a grant « Leonard de Vinci » to go to Iceland. In 1997 he received a grant from the FIACRE (Fonds National d’Art Contemporain) to do a project in New York. In 1998 he also did a residency at the International Studio Program, in New York.

== Statement ==
Since a few years ago, Richard’s paintings leave the canvas to benefit the art space and its walls. This work started in 1996 in Iceland when he released 180 bottles into the sea, each containing a different gouache titled « Months, years ». The bottles were combined with a series of 77 paintings on driftwood from the Icelandic beaches. Since then, a third of the gouaches have been found and collected by different people from Norway, Germany and the United Kingdom. Thanks to this experience he started to rethink his idea about painting and surfaces. Since 1997 he started a long series of "painting steles" and "atmospherics variables", "earth edges" and "lineaments" where parallel works run during the reassessment of paintings. Philippe Richard considers his paintings as juggling between physical spaces and canvas’ spaces. The exhibition space is no more a receptacle; Philippe Richard starts to build a relationship between art pieces and art spaces so that it becomes an active background. Matrix is the result of all his research, making the paintings and the art spaces one.

== Selected exhibitions ==
=== Solo ===
2013

- "International Accident", Theodore:Art, Brooklyn NY
- "Autre pareil, Musée des Beaux-arts de Dunkerque, France

2012

- "Comment dire", La MACC, Fresnes (Val-de-Marne), France
- "Indubitablement", galerie Bernard Jordan, Paris, France
- "Kristin Arndt Philippe Richard", galerie Gudrun Fuckner, Ludwigburg, Germany

2011

- "Idées fixes", Galerie Bernard Jordan, Zurich, Germany
- "Two, Lisa Beck, Philippe Richard", Stephanie Theodore Art, New York, United States

2009

- "Rien à voir avec Henri Matisse", Matisse Museum (Le Cateau), France
- "Souvent d’ailleurs parfois", Galerie Bernard Jordan, Paris, France

2008

- "No limit 4 (enfin seul)", La vigie, Nimes, France

2007

- "Yvetot, donc, vaut Constantinople", Galerie Duchamp, Yvetot, France
- "Fragile", galerie Bernard Jordan, Paris, France

2006

- "Laumeier (38° 32′ 56.45″ N / 90° 24′ 54.56″)", Laumeier Sculpture Park, St. Louis, United States
- (with Egide Viloux), galerie de l’école des beaux-arts, Besançon, France

=== Group ===
2012

- "La fureur de l’éternuement", ESADHaR, Rouen, France

2011

- "Il paesaggio in transito", Societa Siciliana per la Storia Patria, Institut Culturel Français de Sicile, Palermo, Italy
- "Autre pareil, carte blanche à Philippe Richard", Musée des Beaux-arts, Dunkirk, France

2010

- "L’arabesque", Bleu acier inc., Tampa, Florida, United States

2009

- "Off the wall", Lennon Weinberg Gallery, New York, United States
- "Sculpteurs de trottoir", Le Quartier, Centre d’Art Contemporain, Quimper, France
- "Global painting", Les Tanneries, Amilly, Loiret, France
- "Matisse Hoje", Pinacoteca do Estado de São Paulo, Brésil

2008

- "Grandes surfaces", Ecole Supérieure des Beaux-Arts, Le Mans, France
- "de réalité, 60 artistes internationaux", Le Hangar à Bananes, Nantes, France
- "Provisoire II", Musée des beaux-Arts, Tourcoing, France
- "Out of the grey", galerie Jordan-Seydoux, Berlin, Germany

2006

- "Abstraction(s), carte blanche à Bernard Jordan", Matisse Museum (Le Cateau), France

2005

- "Interventions", Savanah College of Art and Design, Lacoste, Vaucluse, France
- "Jim Schmidt Contemporary Art", St. Louis, United States

== Bibliography ==
- Philippe Richard, Painting outside the Lines, Laumeier Sculpture Park, texte de Kim Humphries, en, 2006, Saint-Louis, 6 pages, ISBN 978-0-940337-16-9
- Philippe richard, Le bord du monde n'existe pas, La peinture, à la limite, Red District, texte de Karim Gaddhab, fr/en, septembre 1999, Marseille, 24 pages, ISBN 2-84502-007-4
- Philippe Richard, Miscellaneous: Installations and paintings, europäisches kultur- und informationszentrum in thüringen, Erfurt, 1997, 36 pages

== Articles ==
- STL Today: "Laumeier exhibition", Visual Art, text from David Bonetti, October 12, 2006
- Art Press: Edition spéciale jeune scène française (Fiac 2001), text from Eric Suchère, October 2001, Supplément
- TMM: "Thri Jiuvidarlist i Paris", text from Gunnar Halldorsson, is, June 2001
- Contemporary Visual Art: "Peinture, trois regards", Mick Finch, March 2001, Issue 33
- Art Press: "Peintures, trois regards", text from Tristan Trémeau, February 2001
- Art Press: "Le bord du monde n'existe pas", text from Eric Suchère, June 2000
- Art Press: "Couleur, couleurs", text from Eric Suchère, March 1998, nº223
- Art in America: "Philippe Richard", text from Eric Suchère, January 1998
- Beaux-Arts Magazine: "Exception française à la Villa Medici", text from Tristan Trémeau, 1997
- Tribeca: "Philippe Richard", text from Françoise-Aline Blin, April/May 1997
- Die neue bildende Kunst: "Die polymorphe malerei", text from Eric Suchère, October/November 1996
- Art Press: "Philippe Richard", text from Eric Suchère, December 1995
- Kunstforum: " Der Herzog auf dem Kirschen und die Prinzessin aug der Erbste", text from Maribel Königer, November 1995
- Beaux-Arts magazine: " Philippe Richard, le fond, la forme et l'illusion", text from Karen Rudolph, October 1995
