= Pierre-Alexandre Wille =

French painter

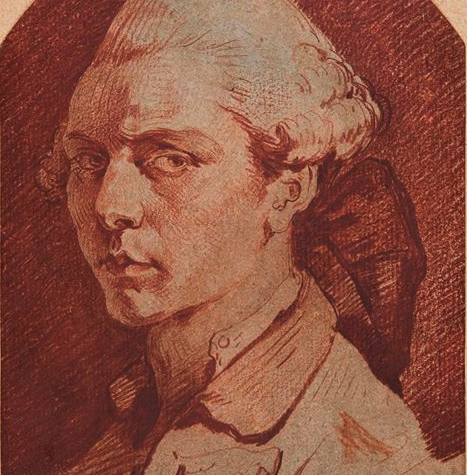
Self-portrait (1769)

The Last Moments of a Beloved Wife (1784), Musée des Beaux-Arts de Cambrai

Pierre-Alexandre Wille (19 July 1748 – 1837) was a French genre painter.

== Life and work ==
Wille was born in Paris. Son of the engraver, Johann Georg Wille, he received his first lessons in art at his father's studio. From 1761 to 1763, he studied with Jean-Baptiste Greuze, then with Joseph-Marie Vien. Relying on his father's influence to promote his career, he became a member of the Académie Royale de Peinture et de Sculpture in 1774, but never became an Academician. The following year, he married Claude-Paule Abau. He exhibited at most of the Salons from 1775 to 1787. For a time, he served as a court painter to King Louis XVI. Some of his paintings were engraved by his father.

During the French Revolution, he served with the Garde Nationale, but was ruined financially. He continued to paint, although his work had become hopelessly out of fashion. He held his last exhibit (a few watercolors) at the Salon in 1819.

In 1821, after recurring bouts of illness over twelve years, Claude-Paule went mad and was committed to the asylum at Charenton. In order to pay the cost of her stay there, he had to appeal for charity from Duchess Marie Thérèse. Nothing more was heard from him, and it was long assumed that he died shortly after; possibly also in a hospital. More recently, the British writer, Colin Clark, son of the art historian, Kenneth Clark, was able to establish that he had died in poverty in Paris in 1837, at the age of eighty-eight.
