= Morenchies =

Former commune in France

Coordinates: 50°12′N 3°14′E

Morenchies is a former commune in the Nord department in northern France. In 1971 it was merged into Cambrai.

== Heraldry ==
Arms of Morenchies	The arms of Morenchies are blazoned : Per fess 1: Azure, a latin cross enfiled of a crown of thorns Or; 2: Gules, 3 fleurs de lys Or. (Boussières-en-Cambrésis, Morenchies and Quiévy use the same arms.)

== See also ==
- Communes of the Nord department
