= Quiévy =

- Commune
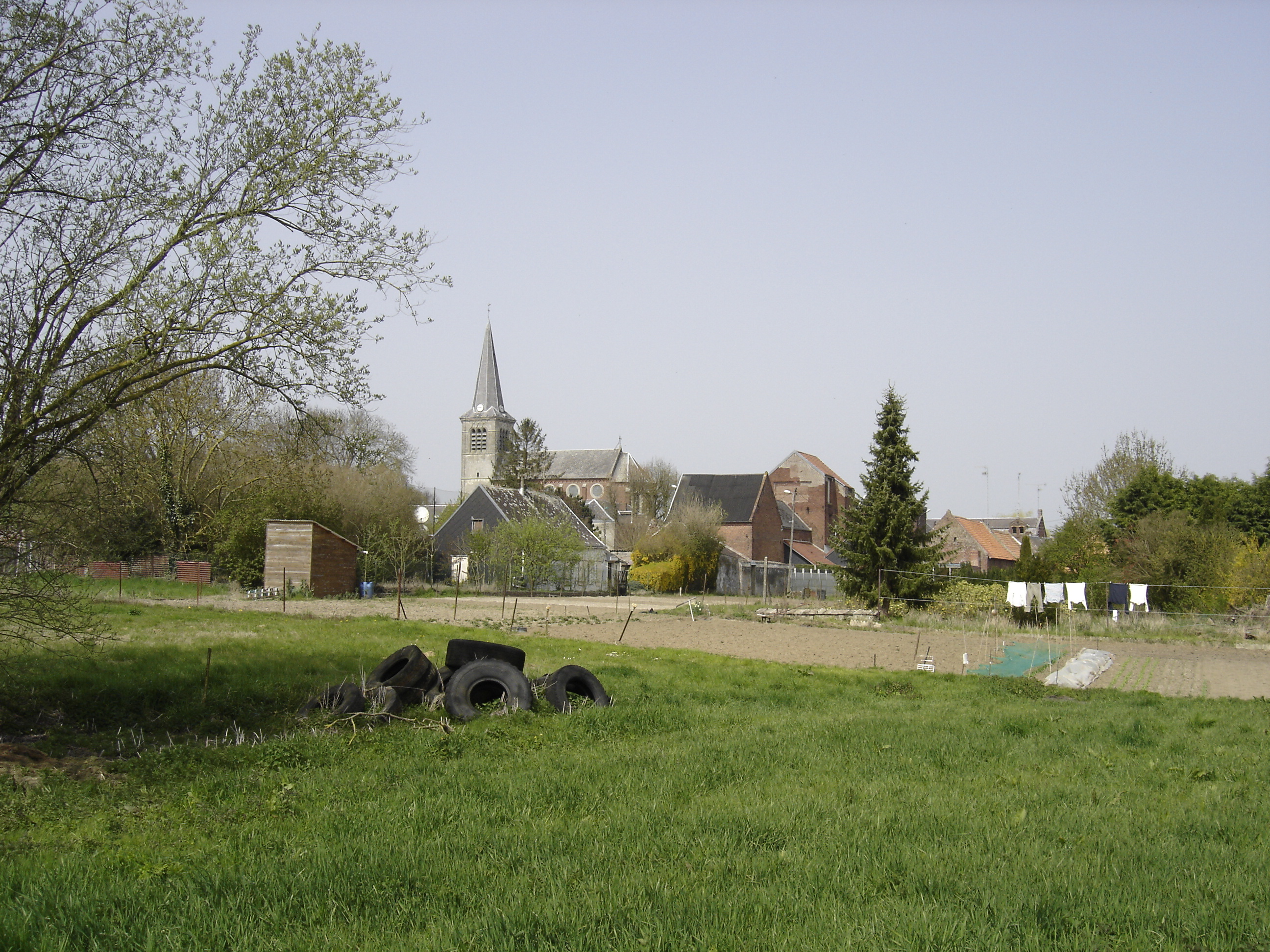
- A general view of Quiévy

- Coat of arms
- Location of Quiévy
- Location within France Location within Hauts-de-France
- Coordinates: 50°10′01″N 3°25′42″E
- Country: France
- Region: Hauts-de-France
- Department: Nord
- Arrondissement: Cambrai
- Canton: Caudry
- Intercommunality: CA Caudrésis–Catésis

Government
  - Mayor (2021–2026): Sylvain Halle
- Area^{1}: 6.86 km^{2} (2.65 sq mi)
- Elevation: 100 m (330 ft)
- Highest elevation: 117 m (384 ft)
- Lowest elevation: 75 m (246 ft)
- Population (2023): 1,803
  - Density: 263/km^{2} (681/sq mi)
- Time zone: UTC+01:00 (CET)
  - Summer (DST): UTC+02:00 (CEST)
- INSEE/Postal code: 59485 /59214
- ^{1} French Land Register data, which excludes lakes, ponds, glaciers > 1 km^{2} (0.386 sq mi or 247 acres) and river estuaries.

Quiévy (French pronunciation: [kjevi]) is a commune in the Nord department in northern France.

== Heraldry ==
Arms of Quiévy	The arms of Quiévy are blazoned : Per fess 1: Azure, a latin cross enfiled of a crown of thorns Or; 2: Gules, 3 fleurs de lys Or. (Boussières-en-Cambrésis, Morenchies and Quiévy use the same arms.)

== See also ==
- Communes of the Nord department
