= Auguste Herbin =

French painter (1882–1960)

- Born: 29 April 1882; Quiévy, Nord
- Died: 31 January 1960 (aged 77); Paris
- Education: École des Beaux-Arts de Lille
- Known for: Painting, printmaking, sculpture, drawing, collage
- Movement: Post-Impressionism; cubism; abstract art

Auguste Herbin (29 April 1882 – 31 January 1960) was a French painter of modern art. He is best known for his Cubist and abstract paintings consisting of colorful geometric figures. He co-founded the groups Abstraction-Création and Salon des Réalités Nouvelles, which promoted non-figurative abstract art.

== Early life ==
Herbin was born in Quiévy, Nord. His father was a craftsman. Herbin studied drawing at the École des Beaux-Arts de Lille, from 1899 to 1901, when he settled in Paris.

== Career ==
Still Life with Azaleas, 1904

The initial influence of Impressionism and Post-Impressionism visible in paintings that he sent to the Salon des Indépendants in 1906 gradually gave way to an involvement with Fauvism, and he exhibited at the Salon d'Automne in 1907.

Auguste Herbin, Le pont de fer (Iron Bridge), 1911, oil on canvas, 63.5 by 80 centimetres (25.0 in × 31.5 in)

In 1914, at the outbreak of World War I, he was exempted from military service because of his short stature and was committed to work in an airplane factory near Paris.

After producing his first abstract paintings in 1917, Herbin came to the attention of Léonce Rosenberg who, after World War I, made him part of the group centred on his Galerie de l'Effort Moderne and exhibited his work there on several occasions in March 1918 and 1921. Herbin's radical reliefs of simple geometric forms in painted wood, such as Colored Wood Relief (1921; Paris, Musée National d'Art Moderne), challenged not only the status of the easel painting but also traditional figure–ground relationships. The incomprehension that greeted these reliefs and related furniture designs, even from those critics most favorably disposed towards Cubism, was such that until 1926 or 1927, he followed Rosenberg's advice to return to a representational style and produced paintings in the New Objectivity style.

Auguste Herbin, Galerie de L'Effort Moderne, March 1918

Herbin himself later disowned his landscapes, still lifes, and genre scenes of this period, such as Bowls Players (1923; Paris, Musée National d'Art Moderne), in which the objects were depicted as schematized volumes. Under the influence of surrealism, he became increasingly critical of the rational forms employed by De Stijl. After 1927, Herbin became interested in microphotographs of crystals and plants and completely abandoned figurative painting.

In the 1930s, he co-founded the group Abstraction-Création in Paris and served as publisher and author for the journal Abstraction-Création. Art non figurativ. In the second issue of the journal, he wrote against the rising Fascism and oppression of all kinds. As a member of the Communist Association des Écrivains et Artistes Révolutionnaires, he signed a statement against the political indifference of artists. Critical of Stalinism, he left the Communist Party in the 1940s.

Beginning in 1942, Herbin developed a language of form and color, his "alphabet plastique". Increasingly, his paintings consist only of colorful arrangements of triangles, circles, and rectangles. In 1946, he was one of the founders of the Salon des Réalités Nouvelles, a successor of Abstraction-Création. He later served as the group's vice-president.

== Late life and death ==
After 1953, Herbin was paralyzed on the right side, forcing him to paint with the left hand. He died in Paris on 31 January 1960. One painting remained unfinished—the motif of the painting was constructed on the word Fin.

During the 2000s, an important series of original Herbin's signed rugs were realised by Didier Marien from the Boccara Gallery with the agreement of the rights holders. Those rugs exhibited in France, but also in Moscow, London and New York played a key role in the worldwide rediscovery of Herbin's artistic creations.

== Public collections ==
Among the public collections holding works by Auguste Herbin are:

- Museum de Fundatie, Zwolle, The Netherlands
- Kröller-Müller Museum, Otterlo, The Netherlands
- National Galleries of Scotland
- Matisse Museum, Le Cateau-Cambrésis, France
- KUNSTEN Museum of Modern Art Aalborg, Denmark
- Museum of Modern Art, Ceret, France
- Neuberger Museum of Art, New York, U.S.
