= Musée Matisse (Nice) =

Biographical art museum in France

Coordinates: 43°43′10″N 7°16′34″E

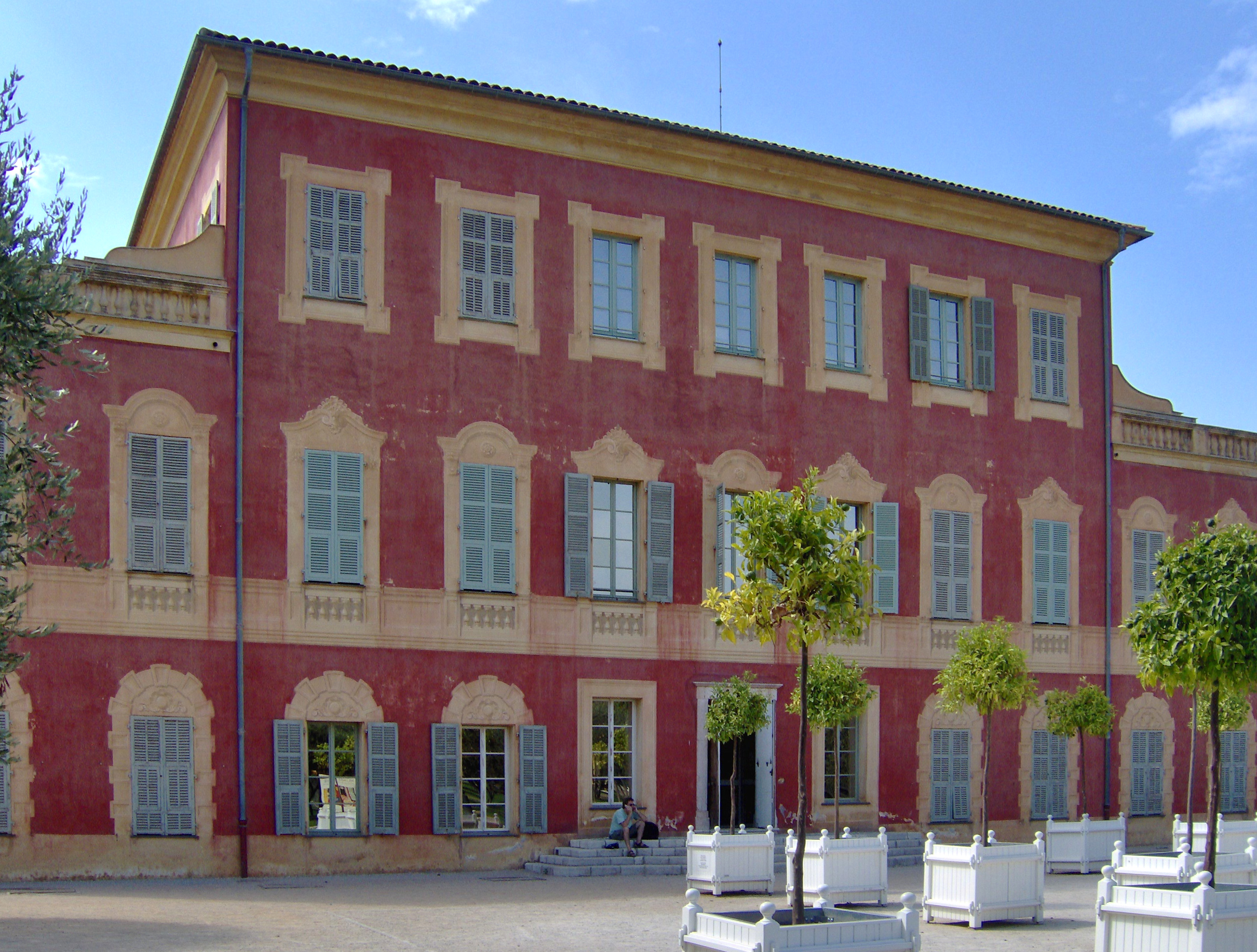
- Established: 1963; 63 years ago
- Location: 164, Avenue des Arènes de Cimiez; 06000 Nice, France
- Type: Art museum
- Website: www.musee-matisse-nice.org

The Musée Matisse (French: [myze matis]) in Nice is a municipal museum devoted to the work of French painter Henri Matisse. It gathers one of the world's largest collections of his works, tracing his artistic beginnings and his evolution through his last works. The museum, which opened in 1963, is located in the Villa des Arènes, a seventeenth-century villa in the neighborhood of Cimiez.

== Description ==
The Villa des Arènes was constructed from 1670 to 1685. Upon its completion, it was named the Gubernatis palace after its sponsor and owner, Jean-Baptiste Gubernatis, then consul in Nice. The villa took its current name in 1950, when the City of Nice, anxious to preserve it, bought it from a real estate company.

The museum was created in 1963 and occupied the first floor of the villa, the ground floor being then occupied by a museum of archaeology. In 1989, the archaeological museum was moved to the nearby ancient site of the city, allowing the Musée Matisse to be expanded. It was closed for four years during renovations, and reopened in 1993. With a new modern wing as well as renovated spaces, the museum could exhibit its entire permanent collection, which has continued to increase since 1963 through several successive acquisitions and donations.

The museum's permanent collection is made up of a variety of donations, primarily those of Matisse himself, who lived and worked in Nice from 1917 to 1954, and those of his heirs, as well as works contributed by the State. The museum houses 68 paintings and gouaches, 236 drawings, 218 prints, 95 photos, 57 sculptures and 14 books illustrated by Matisse, 187 objects that belonged to the painter, and prints, tapestries, ceramics, stained glass and documents.

== See also ==
- List of single-artist museums
- Matisse Museum, Le Cateau-Cambrésis, France
