= Matisse Museum (Le Cateau-Cambrésis) =

Biographical art museum in France

- Musée Départemental Henri Matisse
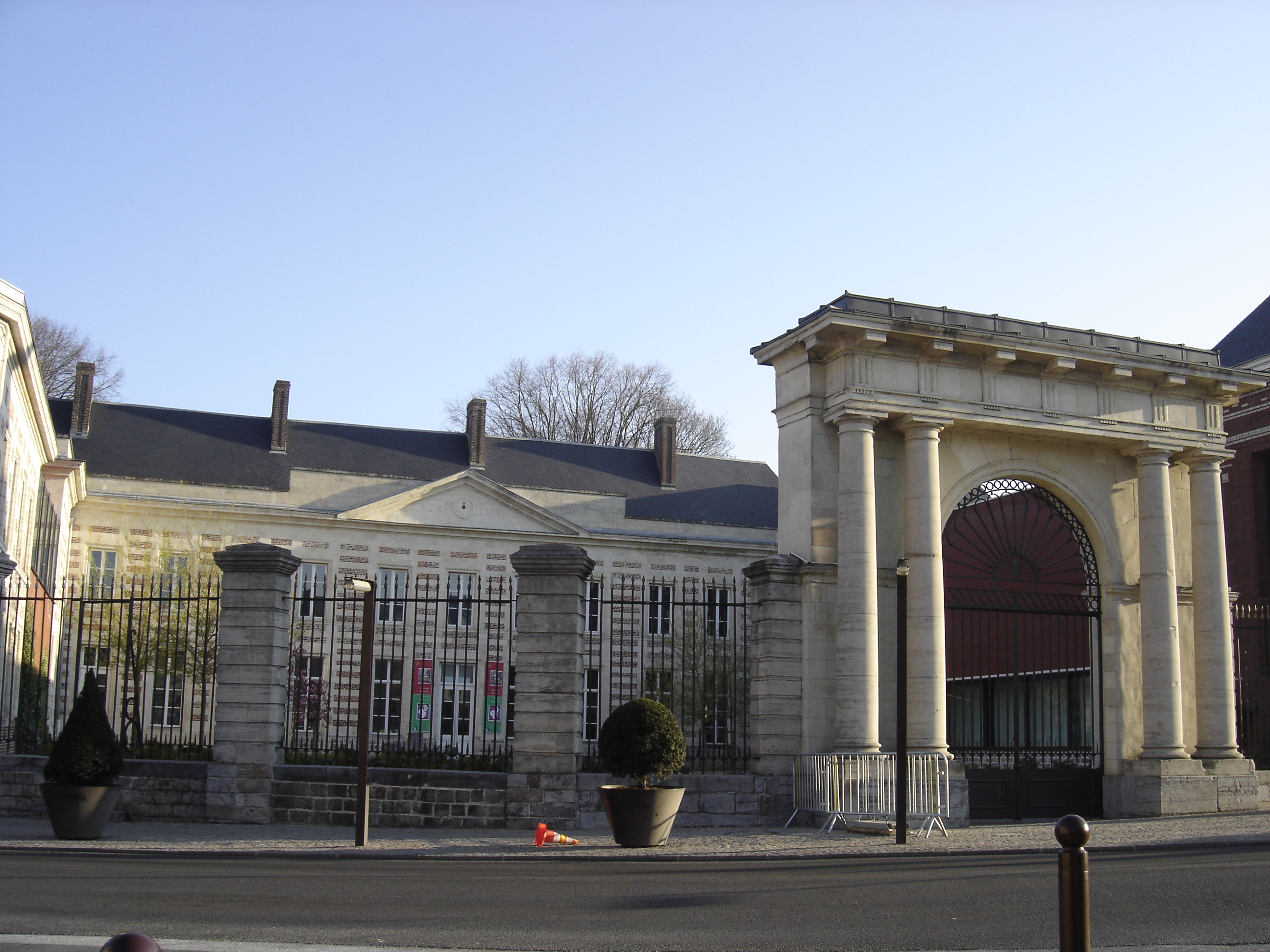
- Established: 1952
- Location: Palais Fénelon, 59360 Le Cateau-Cambrésis, France
- Coordinates: 50°6′23″N 3°32′27″E
- Type: Art museum
- Collection size: 300
- Curator: Carrie Pilto
- Website: Musée Matisse du Cateau-Cambrésis

The Matisse Museum (Musée Départemental Henri Matisse) is a museum in Le Cateau-Cambrésis, France that primarily displays paintings by Henri Matisse. The museum was established by Matisse himself on 8 November 1952; he also defined the way his works should be arranged. At that time the museum was located in the wedding room of the Le Cateau City Hall.

In 1956, after the death of Matisse, the collection of the museum was enlarged by the gift of 65 paintings by Auguste Herbin.

The Museum was moved to the « Fénelon Palace » (Palais Fénelon), also in Le Cateau, in 1982, and its ownership was transferred by the city to the Nord department in 1992; after three years of construction and refurbishment, it reopened on 8 November 2002.

The Museum now has the third largest collection of Matisse works in France.

With seventeen exhibition rooms, and over a surface of about 4,600 square metres (50,000 ft^{2}), the Museum displays more than 170 Matisse works, as well as 65 paintings by Auguste Herbin, given by the artist, paintings by Geneviève Claisse, relative and student of Herbin, elements of the Tériade collection of artists' books and 30 photographs from the Henri Cartier-Bresson collection.

The Museum also regularly hosts temporary exhibits.

== History of the Fénelon Palace ==
The Fénelon Palace which houses most of the museum was used as a refuge by the bishops of Cambrai. It was rebuilt during the 18th century by Théodore Brongniart who also created a monumental porch of neoclassic style.

The Catesians have given it this name due to François Fénelon, who was Archbishop of Cambrai. The classical French garden of the Palace was designed by Le Nôtre.

During the 19th century, the building was transformed into a cotton mill. After that, from 1878, it was bought by the city and used as a school for the children of Le Cateau and later converted to museum in 1982.

== List of the works ==
- Unité (Unity) by Geneviève Claisse, acrylic on canvas (1969)
- Bois sculpté (Sculpted wood) by Auguste Herbin, painted wood sculpture (1921)
- Lénine-Staline (Lenin - Stalin) by Auguste Herbin, oil on canvas (1948)
- Réalité spirituelle (Spiritual reality) by Auguste Herbin, oil on canvas (1938)
- Union (Union) by Auguste Herbin, oil on canvas (1959)
- Coquelicots et Iris II (Red poppies and Iris II) by Henri Matisse, oil on canvas
- Étude pour La Vierge et l'enfant (Study for Virgin and child) by Henri Matisse, ink and bodycolor on paper (1951)
- Femme à la gandoura bleue (Woman in blue gandurah) by Henri Matisse, oil on canvas (1951)
- Femme au chapeau (Woman with a hat) by Henri Matisse, charcoal on paper (1951)
- Intérieur aux barres de soleil (Interior with sun bars) by Henri Matisse, oil on canvas (1942)
- Le Violoniste (The violinist) by Henri Matisse, charcoal on canvas (1917)
- Marguerite au chapeau de cuir (Marguerite with a leather hat) by Henri Matisse, oil on canvas (1914)
- Nu accroupi (Crouching nude) by Henri Matisse, charcoal on paper (1936)
- Nu rose, intérieur rouge (Pink nude, red interior) by Henri Matisse, oil on canvas (1947)
- Tahiti II (Tahiti II) by Henri Matisse, bodycolor on canvas (1936)

== Curator ==
In 2013, Carrie Pilto was appointed the director of the Matisse Museum. Pilto was previously a project assistant curator at the San Francisco Museum of Modern Art from 2007 until 2011, where she worked on "The Steins Collect," a travelling exhibition of the collection of Gertrude, Leo and Michael Stein. She took over from Dominique Szymusiak.

== Temporary exhibits ==
- Matisse and the tissues' colors, 2004
- Rouault, correspondances avec Matisse, from March 25 to June 17, 2007
- Chagall and Tériade, l'empreinte d'un peintre, from November 18, 2006, to February 26, 2007
- Weaving Matisse, 2014.

== Gallery ==
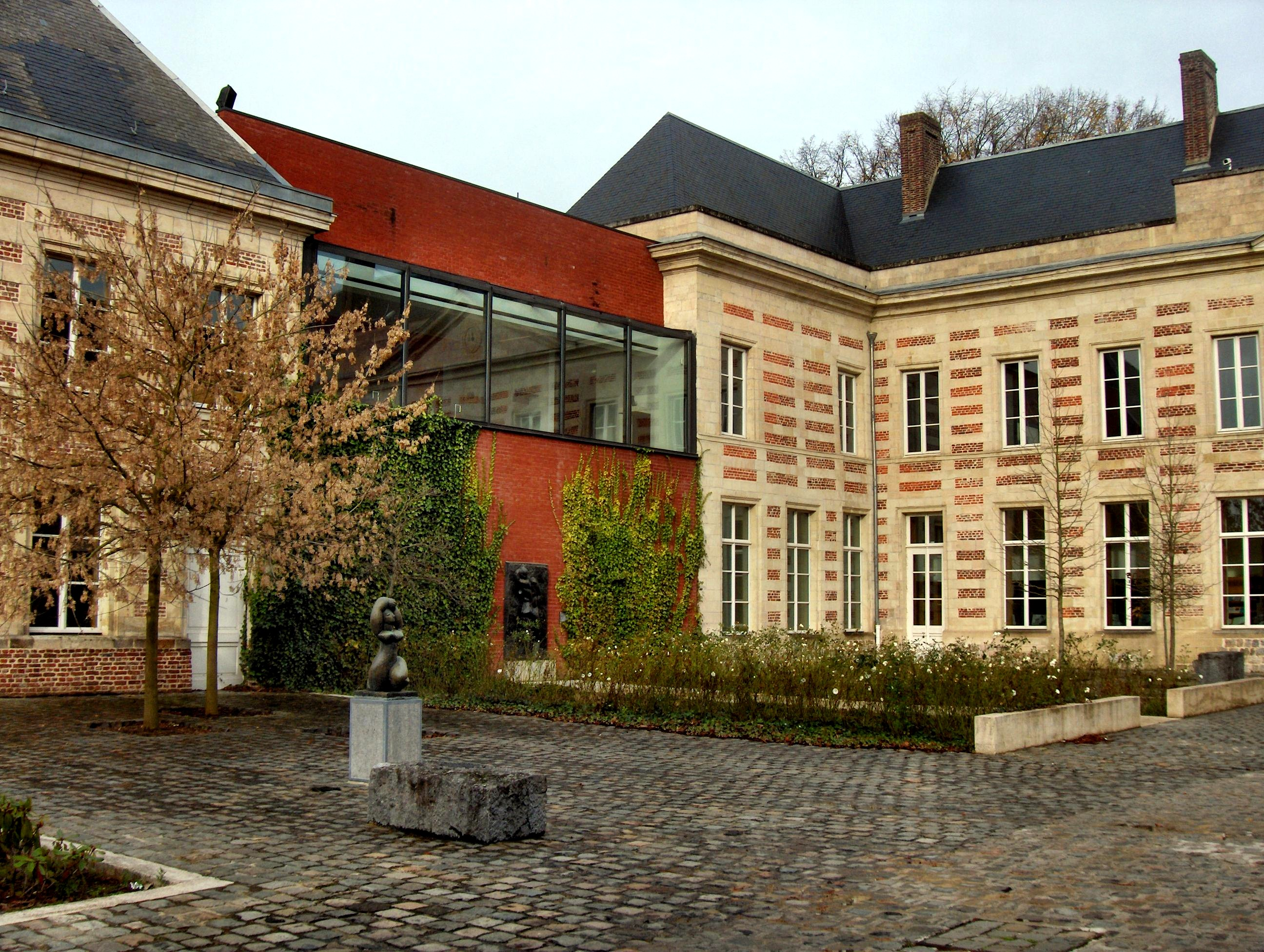

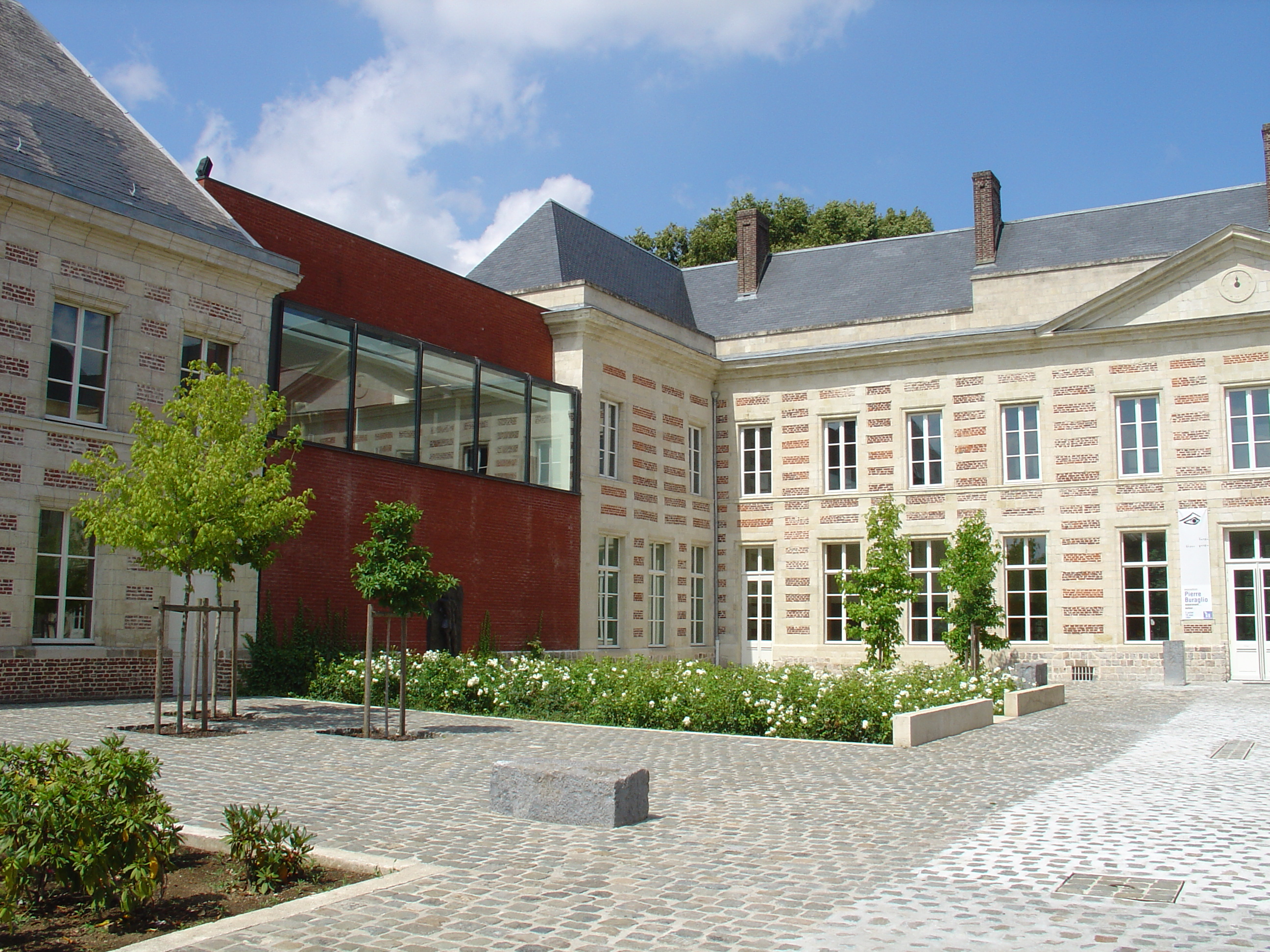

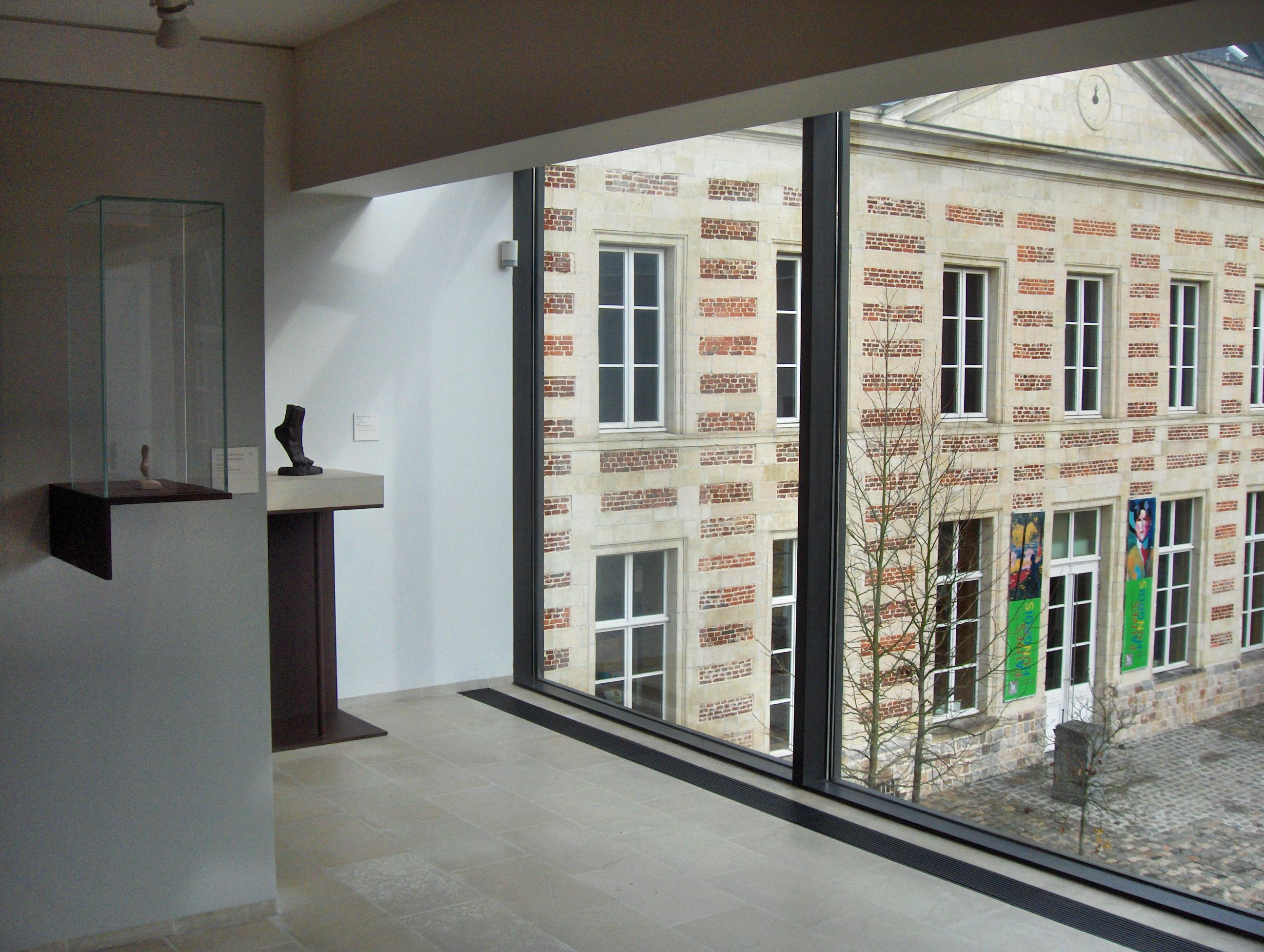

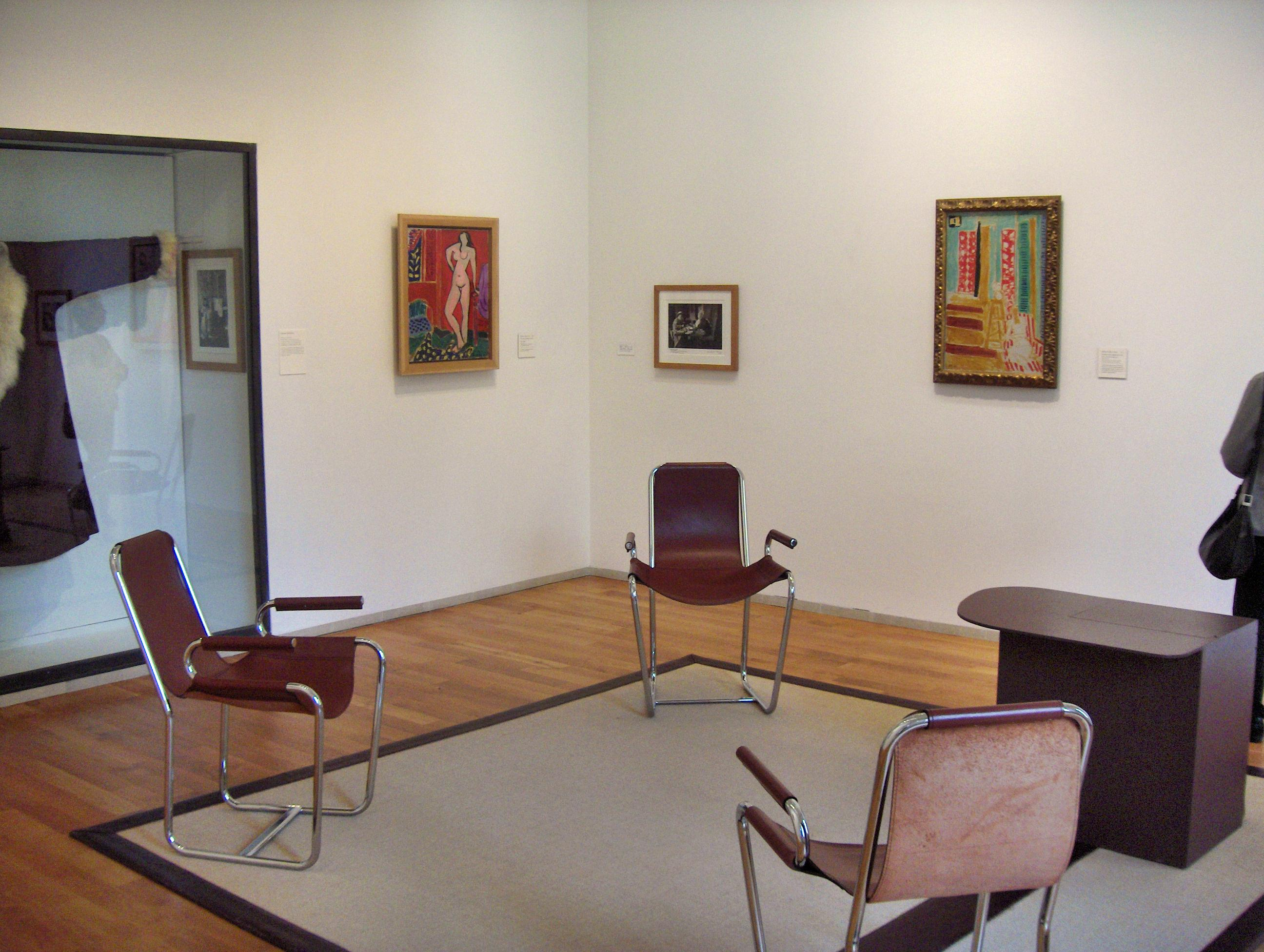

== See also ==
- List of single-artist museums
- Musée Matisse, Nice, France
