= List of aerial victories of Max Ritter von Müller =

Max Ritter von Müller was a German fighter ace credited with shooting down 36 enemy airplanes.

== List of victories ==
This list is complete for entries, though obviously not for all details. Abbreviations from sources utilized were expanded by editor creating this list. Sources: Norman Franks, Frank Bailey, Russell Guest (1993). Above the Lines: The Aces and Fighter Units of the German Air Service, Naval Air Service and Flanders Marine Corps, 1914–1918. Grub Street Publishing, London. ISBN 0-948817-73-9, ISBN 978-0-948817-73-1; Norman Franks, Hal Giblin (2003), Under the Guns of the Kaiser's Aces, Grub Street, London. ISBN 978-1-90401-002-9.

No.	Date/time	Victim	Squadron	Location	Remarks
1	10 October 1916 @ 1100 hours	Airco DH.2	No. 24 Squadron RFC	Between Mory and Vaulx-Vraucourt, France	
2	20 October 1916 @ 1750 hours	Royal Aircraft Factory B.E.12	No. 21 Squadron RFC	Southwest of Grévillers Wood, France	
3	3 November 1916 @ 1540 hours	Royal Aircraft Factory F.E.2b	No. 22 Squadron RFC	Haplincourt, France	
4	16 November 1916 @ 1045 hours	Royal Aircraft Factory F.E.2c	No. 7 Squadron RFC	Northeast of Flers, France	
5	27 November 1916 @ 0945 hours	Nieuport 17	No. 60 Squadron RFC	Hebuterne, France	Also credited to Werner Voss
Transfer					Jagdstaffel 2 to Jagdstaffel 28, 24 January 1917
6	7 April 1917 @ 1820 hours	Royal Aircraft Factory F.E.2d	No. 20 Squadron RFC	Ploegsteert Wood, Belgium	Wounded pilot returned to base with dying observer
7	30 April 1917 @ 1005 hours	Sopwith 1½ Strutter	No. 45 Squadron RFC	East of Armentières, France	
8	2 May 1917 @ 1615 hours	Royal Aircraft Factory B.E.2e	No. 12 Squadron RFC	Ploegsteert Wood, Belgium	Poor match with British loss records
9	7 May 1917 @ 1215 hours	Royal Aircraft Factory F.E.2d		Boezinge (Boesinghe), Belgium	No match in British loss records
10	12 May 1917 @ 1525 Hours	Royal Aircraft Factory R.E.8	No. 53 Squadron RFC	Hollebeke, Belgium	
11	23 May 2020 @ 1615 hours	Royal Aircraft Factory F.E.2d	No. 20 Squadron RFC	Between Houthem and Warneton	
12	24 May 1917 @ 2050 hours	Nieuport		St. Eloi (Sint-Elooi)	Possible antiaircraft victim
13	27 May 1917 @ 1215 hours	Sopwith 1½ Strutter	No. 45 Squadron RFC	Northeast of Ypres, Belgium	
14	3 June 1917 @ 1910 hours	Sopwith 1½ Strutter	No. 45 Squadron RFC	Quesnoy, (Note: There are four places in France whose name is or includes Quesnoy. All are within the area of conflict in 1917, and it may be impossible to determine which one this was.) France	
15	7 June 1917 @ 0915 hours	SPAD	No. 23 Squadron RFC	Between Comines and Warneton	
16	7 June 1917 @ 1145 hours	Sopwith Pup	No. 46 Squadron RFC	Southeast of Roeselare (Roulers), Belgium	
17	8 June 1917 @ 1910 hours	Sopwith Triplane	No. 1 Naval Squadron	Quesnoy, France	
18	20 June 1917 @ 1010 hours	Royal Aircraft Factory R.E.8		Armentieres, France	British reported no losses
19	28 July 1917 @ 1810 hours	Sopwith 1½ Strutter	No. 45 Squadron RFC	Northeast of Ploegsteert, Belgium	Unhurt aircrew returned to base in damaged Strutter
Unconfirmed	Morning of 10 August 1917	Sopwith 1½ Strutter	No. 45 Squadron RFC	Polygon Wood, Belgium	Returned to base out of view of German ground observers
20	10 August 1917 @ 1010 hours	SPAD	No. 23 Squadron RFC	Godhuis	
21	10 August 1917 @ 2030 hours	Airco DH.4	No. 57 Squadron RFC	Ingelmunster, Belgium	
Unconfirmed	10 August 1917	Sopwith 1½ Strutter		North of Ypres, Belgium	
22	17 August 1917 @ 0705 hours	Royal Aircraft Factory S.E.5	No. 56 Squadron RFC	Northeast of Quesnoy, France	
23	19 August 1917 @ 0815 hours	SPAD		Zillebeke Lake	No SPADs lost this day
24	19 August 1917 @ 1810 hours	Nieuport 17	No. 1 Squadron RFC	Menin (Menen)	
25	21 August 1917 @ 0820 hours	Martinsyde G.100	No. 27 Squadron RFC	Douvrin, France	Aircraft and pilot captured
26	21 August 1917 @ 1925 hours	Airco DH.4	No. 57 Squadron RFC	Ledghem	
27	10 September 1917 @ 1930 hours	Sopwith Camel		West of Houthulst Forest, Belgium	
Unconfirmed	29 September 1917	Sopwith 1½ Strutter		Southwest of Diksmuide	
28 & 29	22 October 1917 @ 1625 hours	Sopwith Pup	No. 54 Squadron RFC	West of Beerst, Belgium	Midair collision crashed two Pups
Transfer					Jagdstaffel 28 to Jagdstaffel 2, 3 November 1917
30	7 November 1917 @ 1610 hours	SPAD		Saint-Julien	No matching SPAD losses
31	11 November 1917 @ 1220 hours	Airco DH.5	No. 32 Squadron RFC	Northeast of Ploegsteert, Belgium	
32	29 November 1917 @ 1610 hours	Airco DH.5		Schaapbalie	No DH.5 was reported lost by the British
33	2 December 1917 @ 0945 hours	Airco DH.4	No. 57 Squadron RFC	Northwest of Menin	
34	5 December 1917 @ 1440 hours	Royal Aircraft Factory S.E.5		Southwest of Poelkapelle, Belgium	No SE.5s were lost this date
35	7 December 1917 @ 1155 hours	SPAD	No. 19 Squadron RFC	Moorslede, Belgium	
36	16 December 1917 @ 1410 hours	Sopwith Camel		West of Passchendaele (Passendale)	
