= Battle of Messines (1914) =

Part of the Western Front in World War I

- Part of the Race to the Sea on the Western Front (First World War)
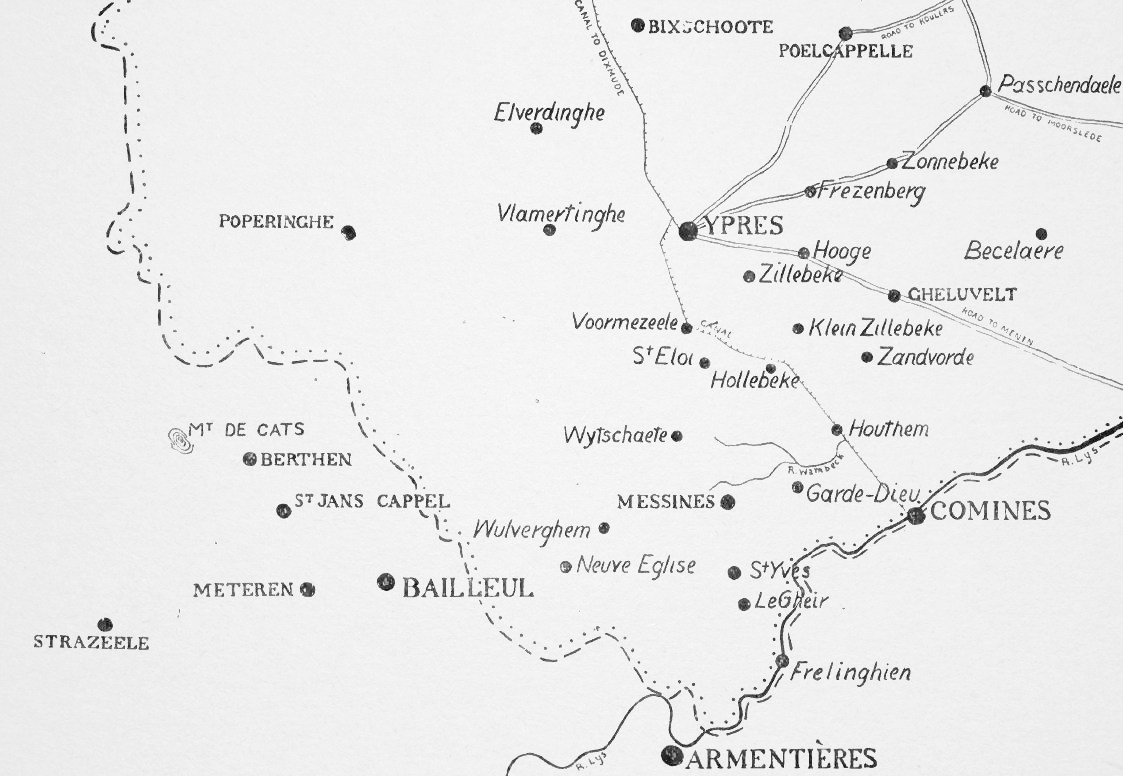
- Messines area, 1914
Date	12 October – 2 November 1914
Location	Messines 50°46′00″N 02°54′00″E
Result	Inconclusive

Belligerents
British Empire: British India; France	German Empire

Commanders and leaders
Edmund Allenby	Crown Prince Rupprecht
- Mesen (Messines in French, historically used in English) in the Belgian province of West Flanders

The Battle of Messines was fought in October 1914 between the armies of the German Empire against the British Empire and France, as part of what came to be called the Race to the Sea: reciprocal attempts by the German and Entente armies to attack beyond the northern flank of their opponent. The attempts to turn the northern flank led to several meeting engagements until the North Sea left neither side with a flank to aim at. The battle was fought between the river Douve and the Comines–Ypres canal. (Note: According to the Battles Nomenclature Committee of 9 July 1920, four battles occurred simultaneously during October and November 1914. The Battle of La Bassée (10 October – 2 November) from the Beuvry–Béthune road to a line from Estaires to Fournes, the Battle of Armentières (13 October – 2 November) from Estaires to the Douve river, the Battle of Messines (12 October – 2 November) from the Douve to the Ypres–Comines Canal and the Battles of Ypres (19 October – 22 November), comprising the Battle of Langemarck (21–24 October), the Battle of Gheluvelt (29–31 October) and the Battle of Nonne Bosschen (11 November), from the Ypres–Comines Canal to Houthulst Forest. James Edmonds, the British official historian in the History of the Great War, wrote that the II Corps battle at La Bassée could be taken as separate but that the battles from Armentières to Messines and Ypres, were better understood as a battle in two parts, an offensive by III Corps and the Cavalry Corps from 12 to 18 October, against which the Germans retired and the offensive by the German 6th and 4th armies 19 October – 2 November, which from 30 October mainly took place north of the Lys at Armentières, from when the battles of Armentières and Messines merged with the Battles of Ypres.)

== Background ==
=== Strategic developments ===
From 17 September to 17 October the belligerents had made reciprocal attempts to turn the northern flank of their opponent. Joseph Joffre, the head of Grand Quartier Général (Chief of the General Staff) ordered the French Second Army to move to the north of the Sixth Army, by transferring by rail from eastern France from 2 to 9 September. Erich von Falkenhayn, Chief of Oberste Heeresleitung (the German General Staff) ordered the German 6th Army to move from the German–French border to the northern flank on 17 September. By the next day French attacks north of the Aisne, led to Falkenhayn to order the 6th Army to repulse French forces and secure the flank.

On 24 September, the French advance met a German attack rather than an open flank and by 29 September, having been reinforced to eight corps, the Second Army was still being opposed by German forces near Lille, rather than advancing around an open German northern (right) flank. The 6th Army had also found that on arrival in the north, it was forced to oppose the French, rather than advance around the French northern (left) flank and that the secondary objective of protecting the northern flank of the German armies in France had become the main task.

=== Tactical developments ===
By 6 October the French needed British reinforcements to withstand German attacks around Lille. The British Expeditionary Force (BEF) had begun to move from the Aisne to Flanders on 5 October and reinforcements from England assembled on the left flank of the Tenth Army, which had been formed from the units on the left (northern) flank of the Second Army on 4 October. The Allies and the Germans attempted to take more ground after the "open" northern flank had disappeared, Franco-British attacks towards Lille in October, being followed up by attempts to advance between the BEF and the Belgian army by a new French Eighth Army. The moves of the German 7th Army and then the 6th Army from Alsace and Lorraine had been intended to secure German lines of communication through Belgium, where the Belgian army had sortied several times during the period between the Franco-British Great Retreat and the First Battle of the Marne. In August British marines had landed at Dunkirk and in October a new German 4th Army was assembled from the III Reserve Corps, the siege artillery used against Antwerp and four of the new reserve corps training in Germany.

== Prelude ==
=== Flanders terrain ===
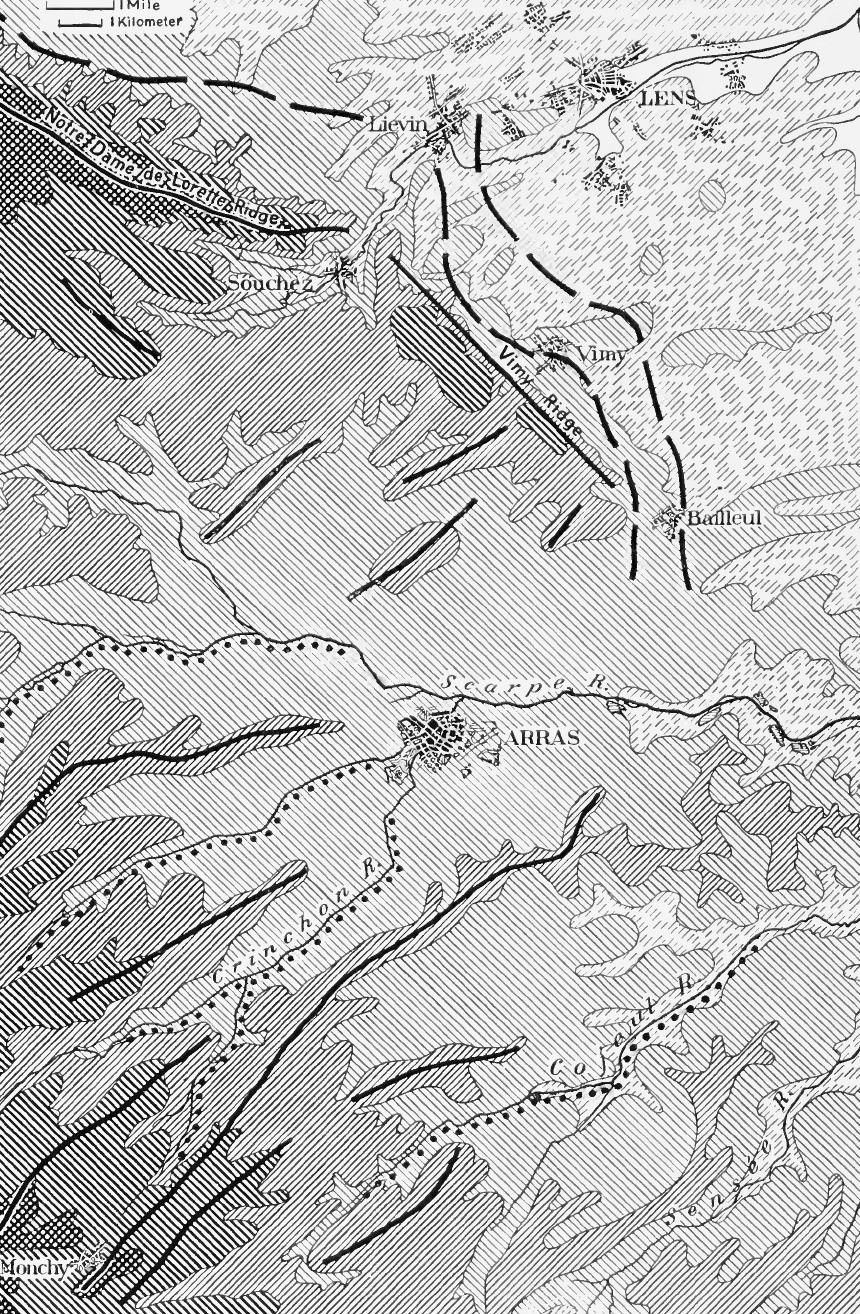
Topography of the Arras–Lens area showing ridge lines

The North-east of France and the south-west of Belgium were known as Flanders. West of a line between Arras and Calais in the north-west, lay chalk downlands, covered with soil sufficient for arable farming. East of the line, the land declines in a series of spurs into the Flanders plain, bounded by canals linking Douai, Béthune, St. Omer and Calais. To the south-east, canals ran between Lens, Lille, Roubaix and Courtrai, the Lys river from Courtrai to Ghent and to the north-west lay the sea. The plain was almost flat, apart from a line of low hills from Cassel, east to Mont des Cats, Mont Noir, Mont Rouge, Scherpenberg and Mont Kemmel. From Kemmel, a low ridge lay to the north-east, declining in elevation past Ypres, through Wytschaete, Gheluvelt and Passchendaele, curving north and then north-west to Diksmuide, where it merged with the plain. A coastal strip about 10 miles (16 km) wide was near sea level and fringed by sand dunes. Inland the ground was mainly meadow, cut by canals, dykes, drainage ditches and roads built up on causeways. The Lys, Yser and upper Scheldt had been canalised and between them the water level underground was close to the surface, rose further in the autumn and filled any dip, the sides of which then collapsed. The ground surface quickly turned to a consistency of cream cheese and on the coast troops were confined to roads, except during frosts.

The rest of the Flanders Plain was woods and small fields, divided by hedgerows planted with trees and cultivated from small villages and farms. The terrain was difficult for infantry operations because of the lack of observation, impossible for mounted action because of the many obstructions and difficult for artillery because of the limited view. South of La Bassée Canal around Lens and Béthune was a coal-mining district full of slag heaps, pit-heads (fosses) and miners' houses (corons). North of the canal, the city of Lille, Tourcoing and Roubaix formed a manufacturing complex, with outlying industries at Armentières, Comines, Halluin and Menin, along the Lys river. With isolated sugar beet and alcohol refineries and a steel works near Aire-sur-la-Lys, the intervening areas were agricultural, with wide roads on shallow foundations and unpaved mud tracks in France, narrow pavé roads along the frontier and in Belgium. In France, the roads were closed by the local authorities during thaws, to preserve the surface and marked by Barrières fermėes signs, which were ignored by British lorry drivers. The difficulty of movement after the end of summer absorbed much of the local labour on road maintenance, leaving field defences to be built by front-line soldiers.

=== British preparations ===
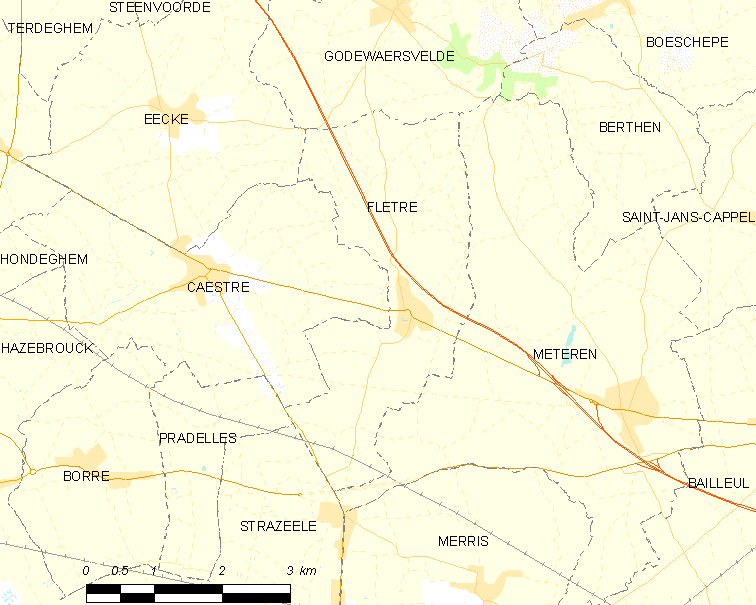
Modern map, vicinity of Hazbrouck–Flêtre (commune FR insee code 59237)

The 1st and 2nd Cavalry divisions under General Allenby covered the assembly of the III Corps at St. Omer and Hazebrouck from 10–12 October, to allow the III Corps to advance eastwards towards Lille. The cavalry was ordered to extend as far north as Ypres. In front of the First Cavalry Corps, was a line of hills from Mont des Cats to Mont Kemmel, about 400 feet (120 m) above sea level, with spurs running south across the British line of advance, occupied by the German IV Cavalry Corps with three divisions. On 12 October, the British cavalry advanced and found the Germans dug in on Mont des Cats and at Flêtre, on the road from Cassel to Bailleul. The 3rd Cavalry Brigade attacked Mont des Cats, up slopes covered in hop-fields towards a monastery on the hilltop, with dismounted cavalry attacking from the west and mounted cavalry with a battery of horse artillery from the south. Next day the cavalry advanced onto high ground east of Mont des Cats and occupied Mont Noir, 3 miles (4.8 km) north of Bailleul. On 14 October, the cavalry advanced north-eastwards, occupied Dranoutre and Kemmel against slight opposition and then reached a line from Dranoutre to Wytschaete, linking with the 3rd Cavalry Division of IV Corps, which had been operating in Belgium since early October.

On 15 October, the cavalry was ordered to reconnoitre the Lys from Estaires to Menin. Estaires was captured by French cavalry but German defences prevented an advance beyond Comines, 5.5 miles (8.9 km) west of Menin, where advanced guards of the German XIX and XIII Corps had arrived during the night. A foothold was gained at Warneton and German outposts at Houthen and Hollebeke, west of the Ypres–Comines canal, were pushed back to the far side. By the end of 15 October, the Cavalry Corps and the 3rd Cavalry Division held the Lys river from Armentières to Comines and the Comines canal to Ypres. The BEF was ordered to make a general advance on 16 October, as the German forces were falling back, except for III Reserve Corps, which was advancing westwards from Antwerp. The cavalry were ordered to cross the Lys between Armentières and Menin as the III Corps advanced north-east, to clear the way for the cavalry and gain touch with the 7th Division near Ypres.

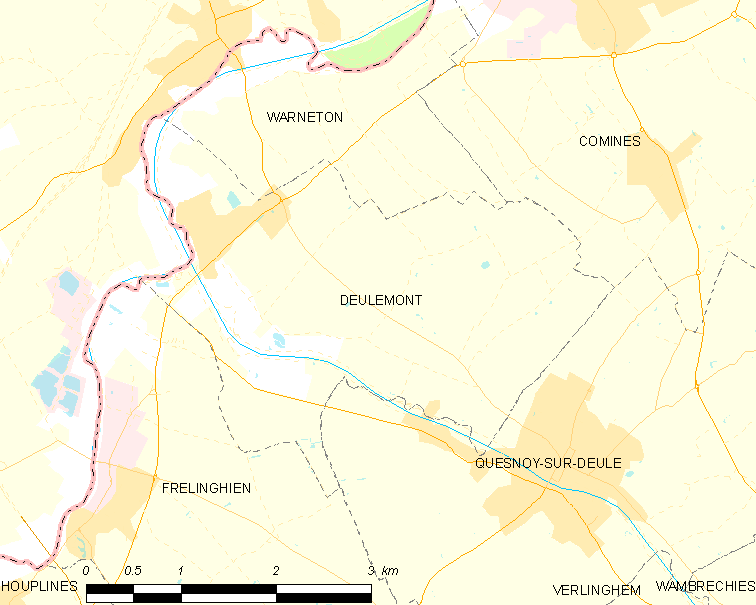
Modern map of Deulemont and vicinity (commune FR insee code 59173)

The cavalry advanced towards the Lys between Houplines and Comines at 6:00 a.m. in fog, which grounded Royal Flying Corps (RFC) reconnaissance aircraft and made artillery support impossible. The river was a muddy stream 45–60 feet (14–18 m) wide and 5 feet (1.5 m) deep at that point, flanked by water meadows. The banks of the Lys were cut by boggy streams and dykes which kept the cavalry on the roads. German outposts were pushed back but the crossings were well-defended and dismounted cavalry attacks were not able to dislodge the German defenders. Cavalry which got to Warneton town square were withdrawn during the night. The attack was resumed on 18 October, when the cavalry attacked from Deûlémont to Tenbrielen but made no progress against a strong and well-organised German defence, ending the day opposite Deûlémont in the south to the railway at Tenbrielen to the north. From 9–18 October, the Cavalry Corps had c. 175 casualties.

== Battle ==
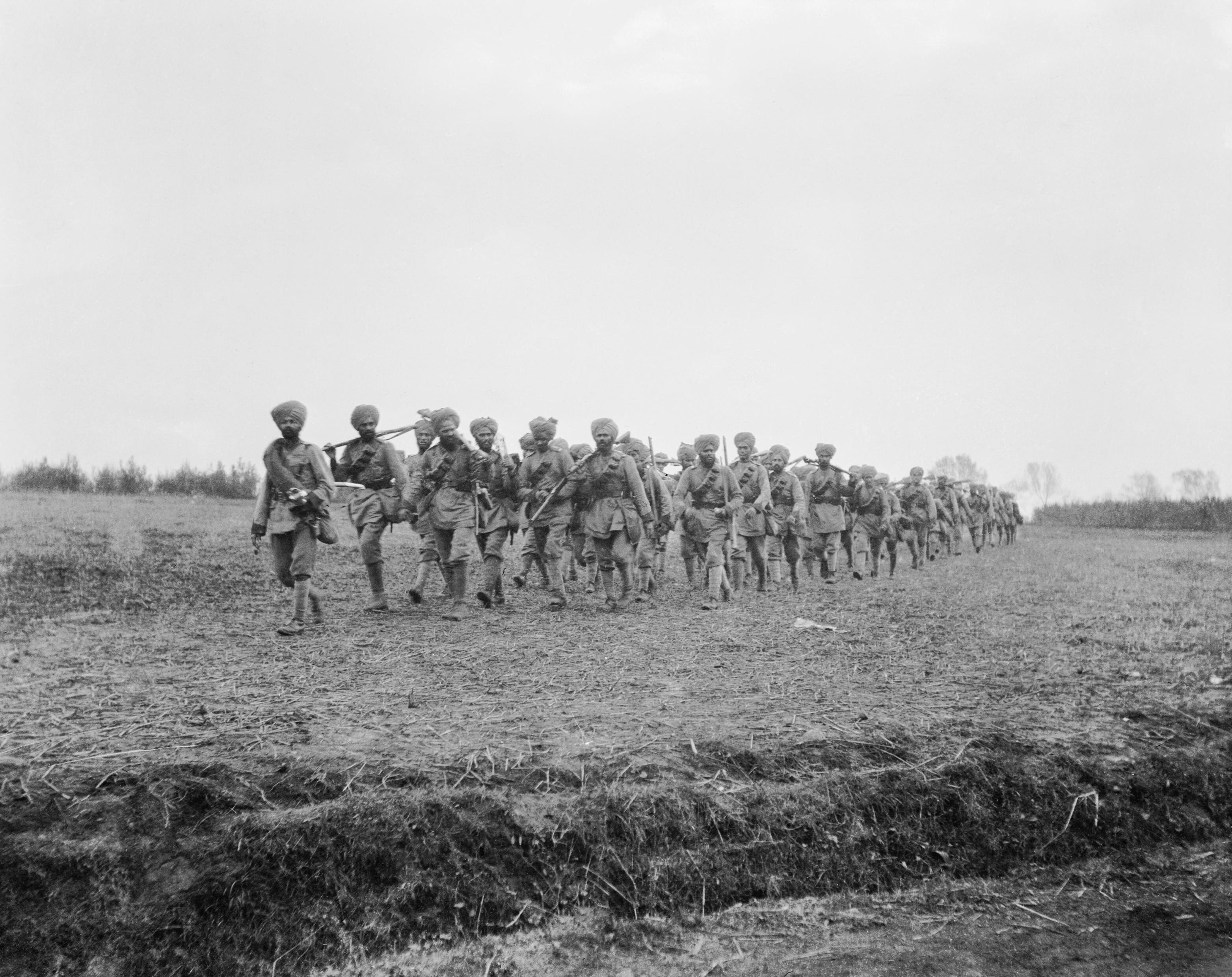
129th Baluchis near Hollebeke

A German attack threatened the left flank of the 1st Cavalry Division (Major-General Beauvoir De Lisle), which held its position on Messines Ridge despite substantial casualties. The 3rd Cavalry Brigade of the 2nd Cavalry Division was shelled out of its positions at Kortewilde and the line was withdrawn to Hollebeke Château. Confusion over the orders, meant the units interpreted the order from Gough to retreat to this new line as an order for a general retreat beyond Hollebeke Château. Once this was realised, Gough ordered an immediate counter-thrust to recapture lost ground. The attack succeeded with little loss, against the German Cavalry Corps. Lieutenant-General Gustav von Hollen, given command of the Cavalry Corps after his performance commanding German IV Cavalry Corps on 20 October, was dismissed and replaced by General Georg von der Marwitz. The 6th Cavalry Brigade and the 7th Division moved to cover the gap that threatened the left flank.

To the south of the 7th Division and 3rd Cavalry Division, the 2nd Cavalry Division was not troubled by the II Bavarian Corps but German artillery caused some difficulty, when it shelled Hollebeke. Gough only had 1,500 men and ten guns of the 10,000 men and fifty guns deemed necessary to defend such a position and the troops were spread over 4 miles (6.4 km). The Germans forced the 3rd Cavalry Brigade out of position at midday. The leading German units were less than 3 miles (4.8 km) from Ypres but pushed no further. The 1st Cavalry Division repulsed German attacks to the south, aimed at Messines. Foch, the Commander in Chief of French forces in the north, sent eight battalions from French XVI Corps to Hollebeke and the French 32nd Division to St Eloi as reinforcements. In the morning a German attack attempted to push between Messines and the Comines Canal held by the Cavalry Corps. Fabeck moved the 6th Bavarian Reserve Division and the 26th Division of the II Bavarian Corps up, to begin the assault during the evening of 30 October.

Here a terrible struggle ensued, in which the English fought in a way to compel our highest respect, as least as regards their soldierly qualities. In the village itself they had occupied every house, the streets were barred by barricades – metres in thickness, the windows of the houses stuffed up with sandbags, the doors barricaded with furniture and stones; through the walls they drilled loopholes scarcely visible; each house was a small fortress, scattering death and destruction.

— Anonymous German soldier

The German 26th Württemberg Division began its offensive at 4:30 a.m. and broke into Messines after nearly five hours of fighting, the 6,000 men of Infantry Brigade 51 facing fewer than 900 British cavalry. The British conducted a house-to-house fight, retreating out of the town and then around noon, the 9th and 13th brigades of II Corps arrived and conducted an advance to the Messines road. The brigades engaged the 6th Bavarian Division, preventing it from supporting the 26th Division, the British suffering many losses, as did the Germans in their efforts to reach Messines. To the north of Messines, the 2nd Cavalry Division was engaged by elements of the 6th Bavarian Reserve Division and all of the 3rd Bavarian Division. Gough received six French artillery batteries and 1 1/2 Indian battalions but were opposed by c. 16,000 German infantry. The French sent a Cuirassier and an infantry brigade from the 32nd Division, although they played little part in the battle. Despite heavy shelling by German guns from 6:00 a.m., no infantry assault took place until 2:45 p.m., due to the advance of II Corps on the right (south) of the 2nd Cavalry Division into the Bavarian flank.

Wytschaete was held by only 415 men of the Household Cavalry Composite Regiment. The ridge between the town and Messines was held by 600 men of the 6th Dragoon Guards and survivors of the London Scottish Regiments, against six German battalions, odds of 12:1. Both were steadily forced back from their positions at the towns and ridge lines by 4:00 a.m. At 6:00 a.m. another German infantry attack developed. Wytschaete had fallen at 2:45 a.m. but German infantry struggled to secure the ridge and did not succeed until 7:35 a.m. The 5th Cavalry Brigade and 9th Brigade committed 12th Lancers and Gough committed the 1st Lincolns and Northumberland Fusiliers from 9th Brigade, to retake the ridge and town. They failed at the ridge but the Lancers recaptured the town. The Lincolns and the Northumberlands lost about 30 per cent of their strength trying to recapture the ridge. The 1st Cavalry Division in the Messines area fell back and the lost ridges exposed Messines to German artillery-fire. As long as Wytschaete (to the north of Messines) and Warneton (to the south of Messines) remained in British hands, it was possible to prevent a German breakthrough in the south.

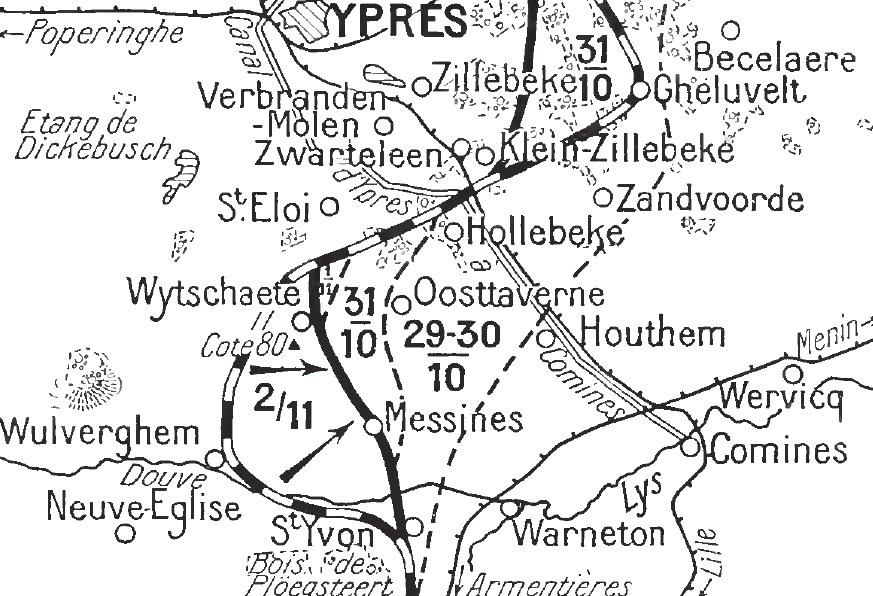
French counter-attack at Messines, 2 November

To safeguard their retirement, the British shelled Messines to prevent the Germans maintaining close contact. RFC aircraft were also busy, attacking German ground forces and harassing advancing columns. Elsewhere the Germans were less successful. The 3rd Pomeranian Division was brought up to drive the British back out of Wytschaete. The French rushed the 32nd Division of I Corps, to reinforce the British in the town and the 39th Division was assigned to recapture Messines. The 39th Division attack failed and the 32nd Division and the remaining British were pushed out of Wytschaete, by the 6th Bavarian Reserve Division of II Bavarian Corps; the Germans suffering many casualties attacking the French 32nd Division. By the morning of the 1 November, the Germans had secured the line and both towns but the ridges to the west of the Wytschaete–Messines line were held by the French 32nd Division. The British were exhausted and most divisions had been reduced to a shadow. The British 7th Division had only 2,380 men left and was withdrawn from the line and replaced by the 8th Division from Britain. The Germans had also suffered high losses and needed to pause to reinforce their formations. The front fell quiet, action being limited to raids by both sides and heavy shelling of Ypres by German artillery. The Germans made their last effort against Ypres on 10 November.

== Aftermath ==
=== Analysis ===
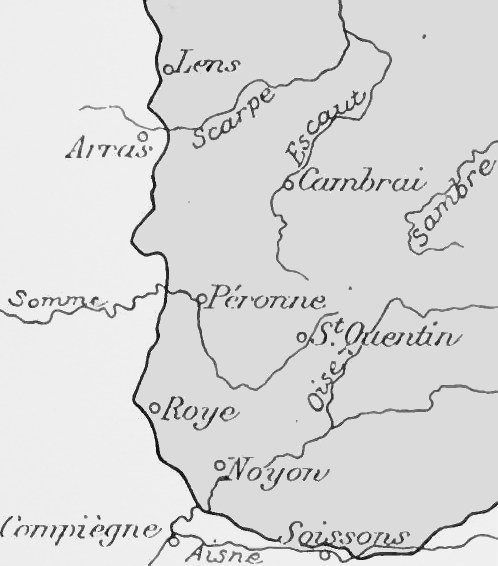
Outline of the Noyon Salient, formed from September–October 1914

The French had been able to use the undamaged railways behind their front, to move troops more quickly than the Germans, who had to take long detours, wait for repairs to damaged tracks and replace rolling stock. The French IV Corps moved from Lorraine on 2 September in 109 trains and assembled by 6 September. The French had been able to move troops in up to 200 trains per day and use hundreds of motor-vehicles, co-ordinated by two staff officers, Commandant Gérard and Captain Doumenc. The French used Belgian and captured German rail wagons and the domestic telephone and telegraph systems. The initiative held by the Germans in August was not recovered as all troop movements to the right flank were piecemeal.

Until the end of the Siege of Maubeuge (24 August – 7 September), only the single line from Trier to Liège, Brussels, Valenciennes and Cambrai was available and had to be used to supply the German armies on the right, while the 6th Army travelled in the opposite direction, limiting the army to forty trains a day, which took four days to move a corps. Information on German troop movements from wireless interception, enabled the French to forestall German moves but the Germans had to rely on reports from spies, which were frequently wrong. The French resorted to more cautious infantry tactics, using cover to reduce casualties and centralised command as the German army commanders followed contradictory plans. The French did not need to obtain a quick decisive result and could concentrate on preserving the French army by parrying German blows.
