= Capinghem =

- Commune
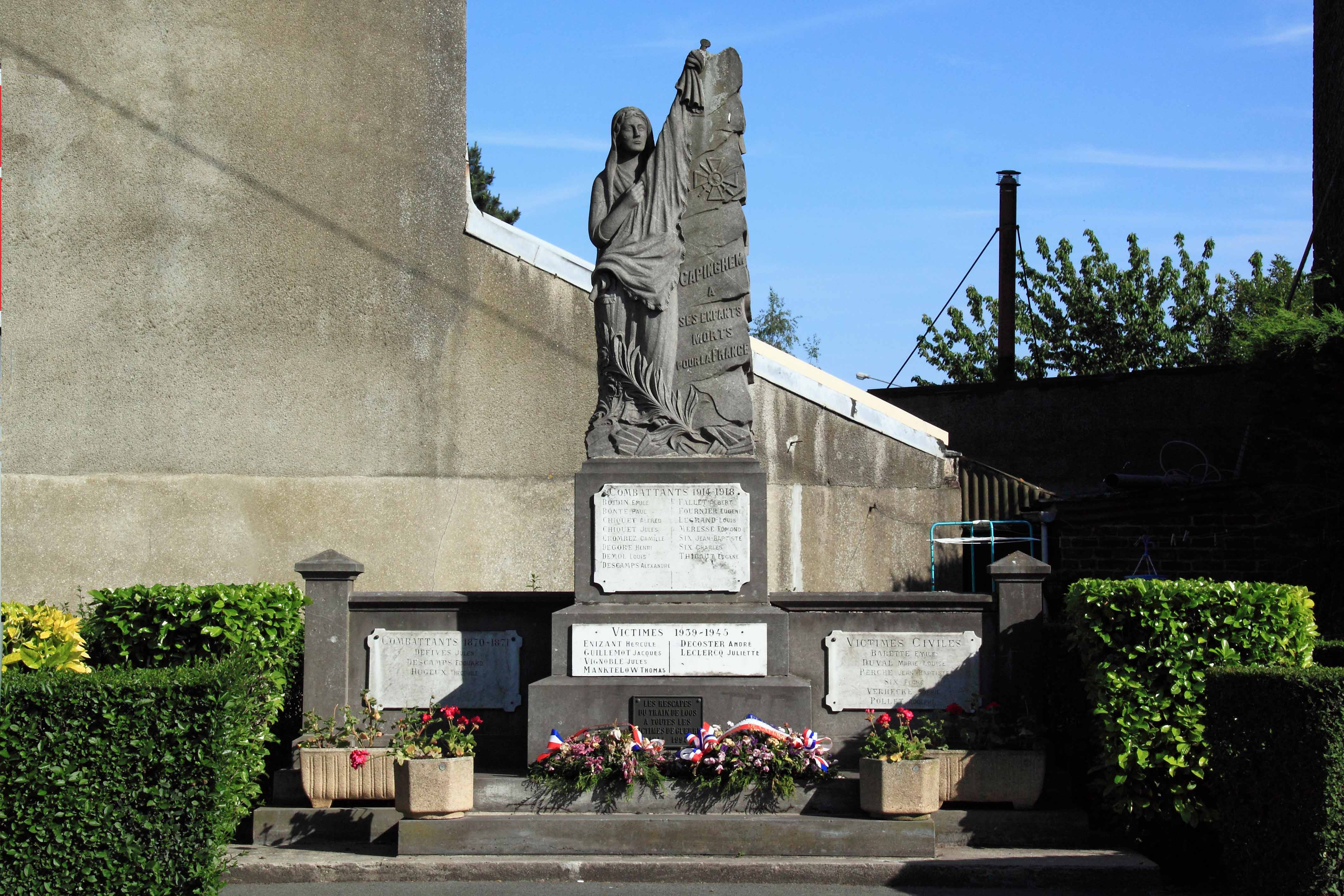
- The war memorial in Capinghem

- Coat of arms
- Location of Capinghem
- Location within France Location within Hauts-de-France
- Coordinates: 50°38′42″N 2°57′46″E
- Country: France
- Region: Hauts-de-France
- Department: Nord
- Arrondissement: Lille
- Canton: Armentières
- Intercommunality: Métropole Européenne de Lille

Government
  - Mayor (2024–2026): Vincent Ducourau
- Area^{1}: 1.86 km^{2} (0.72 sq mi)
- Elevation: 40 m (130 ft)
- Highest elevation: 49 m (161 ft)
- Lowest elevation: 34 m (112 ft)
- Population (2023): 2,728
  - Density: 1,470/km^{2} (3,800/sq mi)
- Time zone: UTC+01:00 (CET)
  - Summer (DST): UTC+02:00 (CEST)
- INSEE/Postal code: 59128 /59160
- ^{1} French Land Register data, which excludes lakes, ponds, glaciers > 1 km^{2} (0.386 sq mi or 247 acres) and river estuaries.

Capinghem (French pronunciation: [kapɛ̃ɡɛm]; archaic Dutch: Campingem) is a commune in the Nord department in northern France. It is part of the Métropole Européenne de Lille.

== Population ==
Historical population
Year	Pop.	±% p.a.
1968	996	—
1975	927	−1.02%
1982	1,130	+2.87%
1990	1,170	+0.44%
1999	1,524	+2.98%
2007	1,606	+0.66%
2012	1,670	+0.78%
2017	2,495	+8.36%
2023	2,728	+1.50%
Source: INSEE

== Heraldry ==
Arms of Capinghem	The arms of Capinghem are blazoned : Sable, a lion argent.

== See also ==
- Communes of the Nord department
