= Yvonne Abbas =

Yvonne Abbas (29 April 1922 – 13 December 2014) was a member of the French Resistance during the Second World War. She survived deportation to Ravensbrück concentration camp.

== Early life ==
Abbas was born in Pérenchies, to an Algerian father who died of tuberculosis when she was a child, resulting in her having to go out to work at the age of thirteen. As an employee of Épiceries du Nord, she became a Communist Party activist and was involved in the industrial action of 1938. At the age of seventeen, she married Florent Debels. Both entered the Resistance and joined the FTP (Francs-tireurs et partisans).

== Life during the Second World War ==
Abbas was arrested on her 20th birthday in 1942 (along with Louis Petit and Jean Bracq, both of whom were shot). She was imprisoned in Rennes and, in April 1944, she was sent to Ravensbrück. There she was subjected to torture and forced labour.

She was working in a munitions factory in Holleischen in May 1945, when the camp was liberated. On her return home, she learned that her husband had been shot and killed at Wambrechies, two months after her address; her brother had also been killed in October 1944 in Belfort.

== Later years ==
Abbas was awarded a number of decorations by the French government:

Officier de l'Ordre national de la Légion d'honneur (1992); Commandeur de la Légion d'honneur (2014)
Médaille militaire
Combattant volontaire de la Résistance
Chevalier dans l'ordre des Palmes académiques

She became President of the musée de la Résistance at Denain, and was a member of the Comité national de l’Amicale de Ravensbrück, and President of the Comité de Lille de l’Anacr.

== Death ==
She died on December 13, 2014, in Loos, Nord.
