= Bois-Grenier =

- Commune
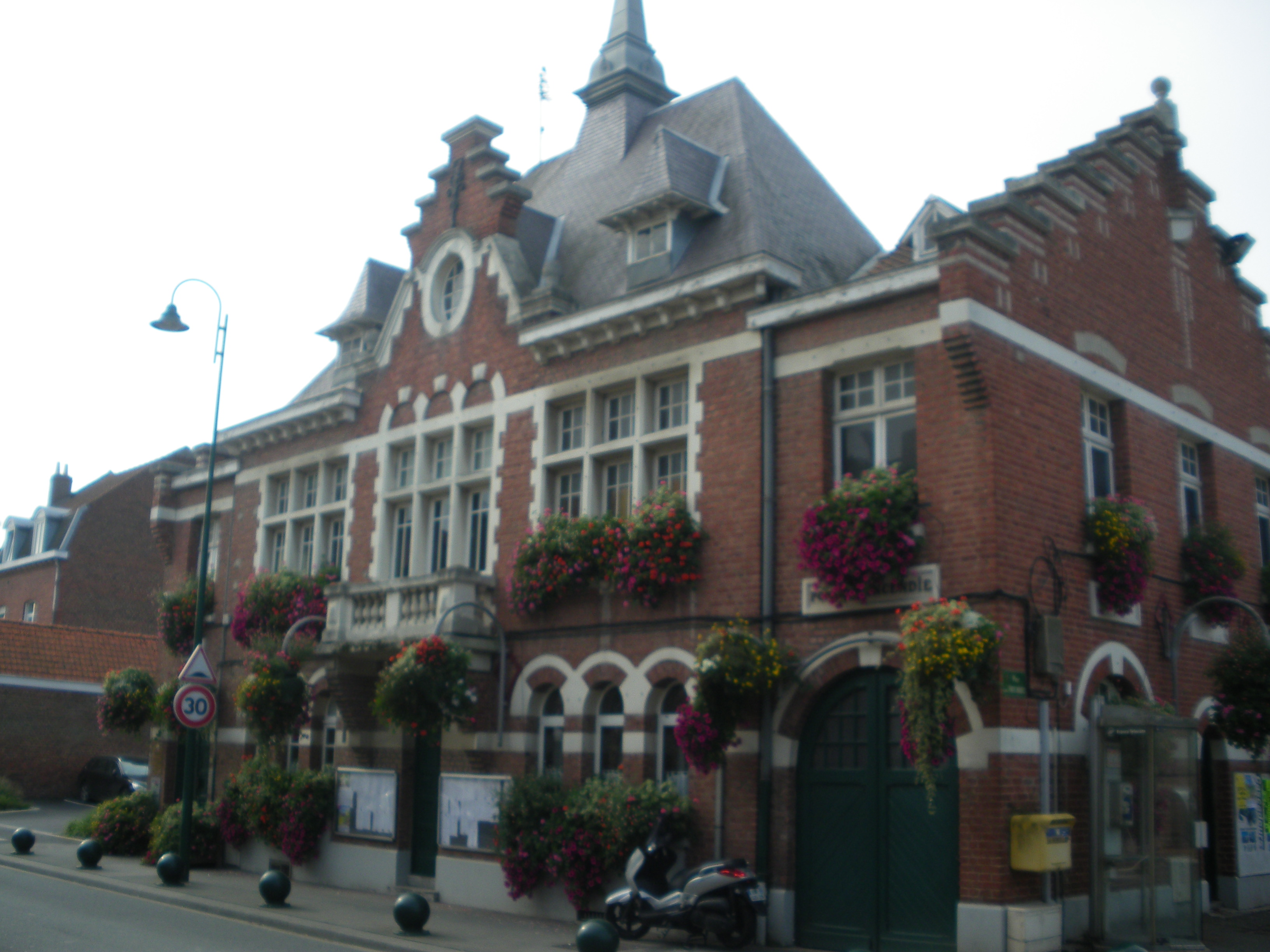
- The town hall in Bois-Grenier

- Coat of arms
- Location of Bois-Grenier
- Location within France Location within Hauts-de-France
- Coordinates: 50°38′59″N 2°52′30″E
- Country: France
- Region: Hauts-de-France
- Department: Nord
- Arrondissement: Lille
- Canton: Armentières
- Intercommunality: Métropole Européenne de Lille

Government
  - Mayor (2020–2026): Michel Delepaul
- Area^{1}: 7.25 km^{2} (2.80 sq mi)
- Elevation: 18 m (59 ft)
- Highest elevation: 20 m (66 ft)
- Lowest elevation: 15 m (49 ft)
- Population (2023): 1,775
  - Density: 245/km^{2} (634/sq mi)
- Time zone: UTC+01:00 (CET)
  - Summer (DST): UTC+02:00 (CEST)
- INSEE/Postal code: 59088 /59280
- ^{1} French Land Register data, which excludes lakes, ponds, glaciers > 1 km^{2} (0.386 sq mi or 247 acres) and river estuaries.

Bois-Grenier (French pronunciation: [bwa ɡʁənje]) is a commune in the Nord department in northern France. Located south of Armentières and bordering with the department of Pas-de-Calais.

== Population ==
Historical population
Year	Pop.	±% p.a.
1968	751	—
1975	1,004	+4.23%
1982	1,218	+2.80%
1990	1,356	+1.35%
1999	1,450	+0.75%
2007	1,403	−0.41%
2012	1,512	+1.51%
2017	1,612	+1.29%
2023	1,775	+1.62%
Source: INSEE

== Heraldry ==
Arms of Bois-Grenier	The arms of Bois-Grenier are blazoned : Quarterly 1: Or, a lion sable, overall a bend compony argent and gules; 2: Argent, a fleur de lys gules, and in chief a sun and a descrescent Or; 3: Azure, a chapel with steeple argent; 4: Gules, a lion argent armed and langued Or.

== See also ==
- Communes of the Nord department
