= Canton of Armentières =

Coordinates: 50°40′27″N 2°54′28″E

Armentières
- Canton
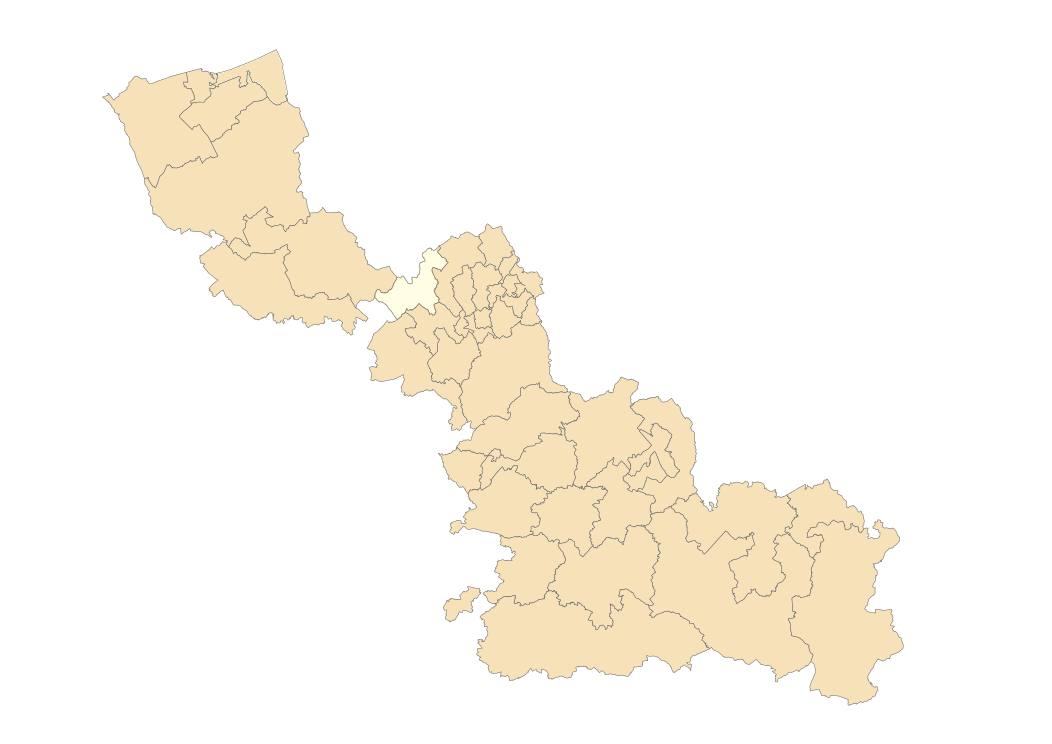
- Map of the canton of Armentières within the Nord department
- Country: France
- Region: {{{region}}}
- Department: {{{department}}}
- No. of communes: {{{nbcomm}}}
- Area: 79.53 km^{2} (30.71 sq mi)
- Population (2023): 68,621
  - Density: 862.8/km^{2} (2,235/sq mi)
- INSEE code: {{{INSEE}}}

The Canton of Armentières is a canton of the Nord département in France.

Since the French canton reorganisation which came into effect in March 2015, the communes of the canton of Armentières are:

- Armentières (chief town)
- Bois-Grenier
- Capinghem
- La Chapelle-d'Armentières
- Deûlémont
- Erquinghem-Lys
- Frelinghien
- Houplines
- Pérenchies
- Prémesques
- Warneton
