= Prémesques =

- Commune
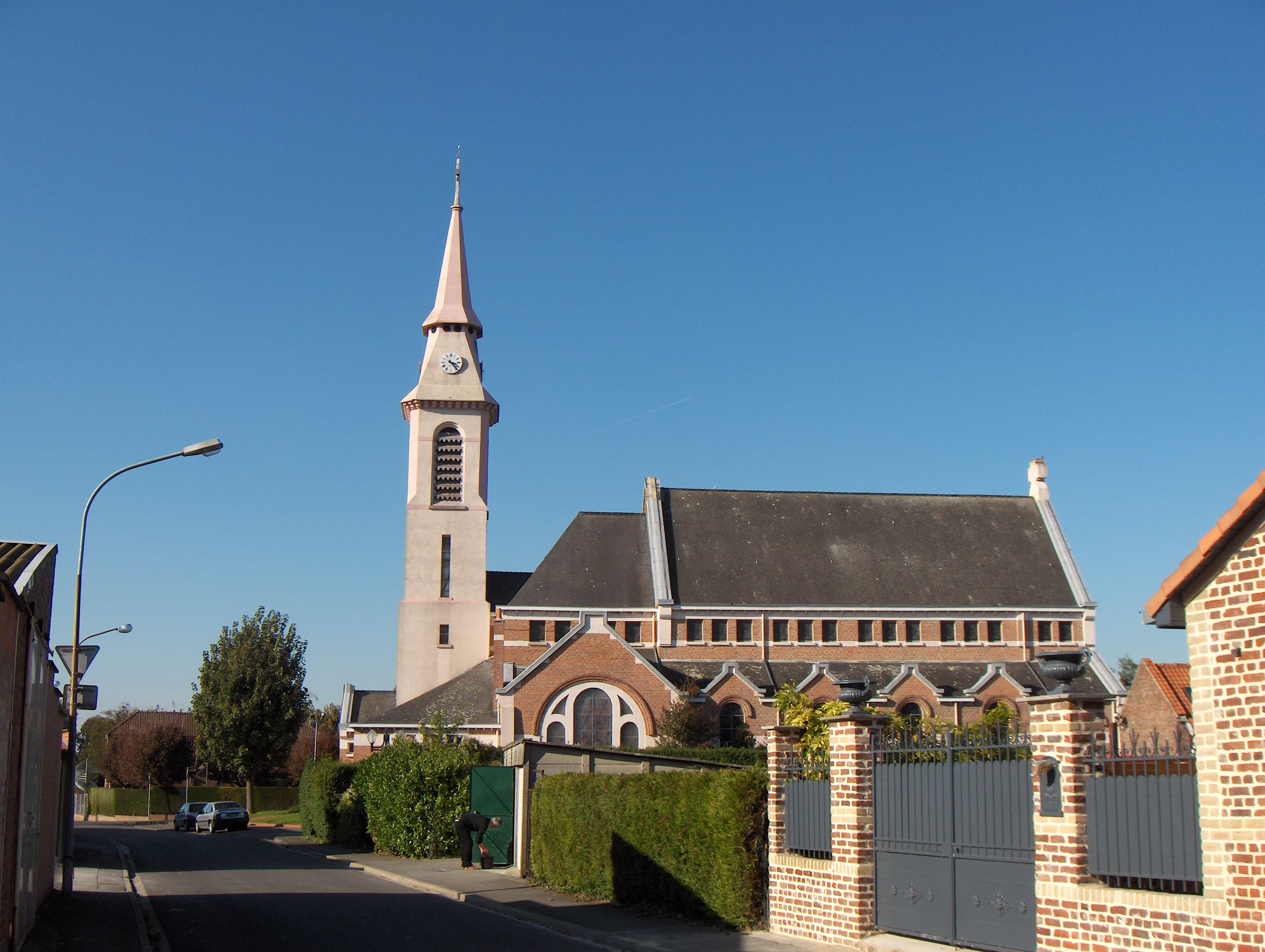
- The church in Prémesques

- Coat of arms
- Location of Prémesques
- Location within France Location within Hauts-de-France
- Coordinates: 50°39′21″N 2°57′12″E
- Country: France
- Region: Hauts-de-France
- Department: Nord
- Arrondissement: Lille
- Canton: Armentières
- Intercommunality: Métropole Européenne de Lille

Government
  - Mayor (2020–2026): Yvan Hutchinson
- Area^{1}: 5.07 km^{2} (1.96 sq mi)
- Elevation: 40 m (130 ft)
- Highest elevation: 42 m (138 ft)
- Lowest elevation: 17 m (56 ft)
- Population (2023): 2,031
  - Density: 401/km^{2} (1,040/sq mi)
- Time zone: UTC+01:00 (CET)
  - Summer (DST): UTC+02:00 (CEST)
- INSEE/Postal code: 59470 /59840
- ^{1} French Land Register data, which excludes lakes, ponds, glaciers > 1 km^{2} (0.386 sq mi or 247 acres) and river estuaries.

Prémesques (French pronunciation: [pʁemɛk]; Dutch: Permeke) is a commune in the Nord department in northern France. It is part of the Métropole Européenne de Lille.

== Population ==
Historical population
Year	Pop.	±% p.a.
1968	1,141	—
1975	1,089	−0.66%
1982	1,416	+3.82%
1990	1,922	+3.89%
1999	1,925	+0.02%
2007	2,115	+1.18%
2012	2,211	+0.89%
2017	2,130	−0.74%
2023	2,031	−0.79%
Source: INSEE

== Heraldry ==
Arms of Prémesques	The arms of Prémesques are blazoned : Barry indented argent and azure.

== See also ==
- Communes of the Nord department
