= Frelinghien =

- Commune
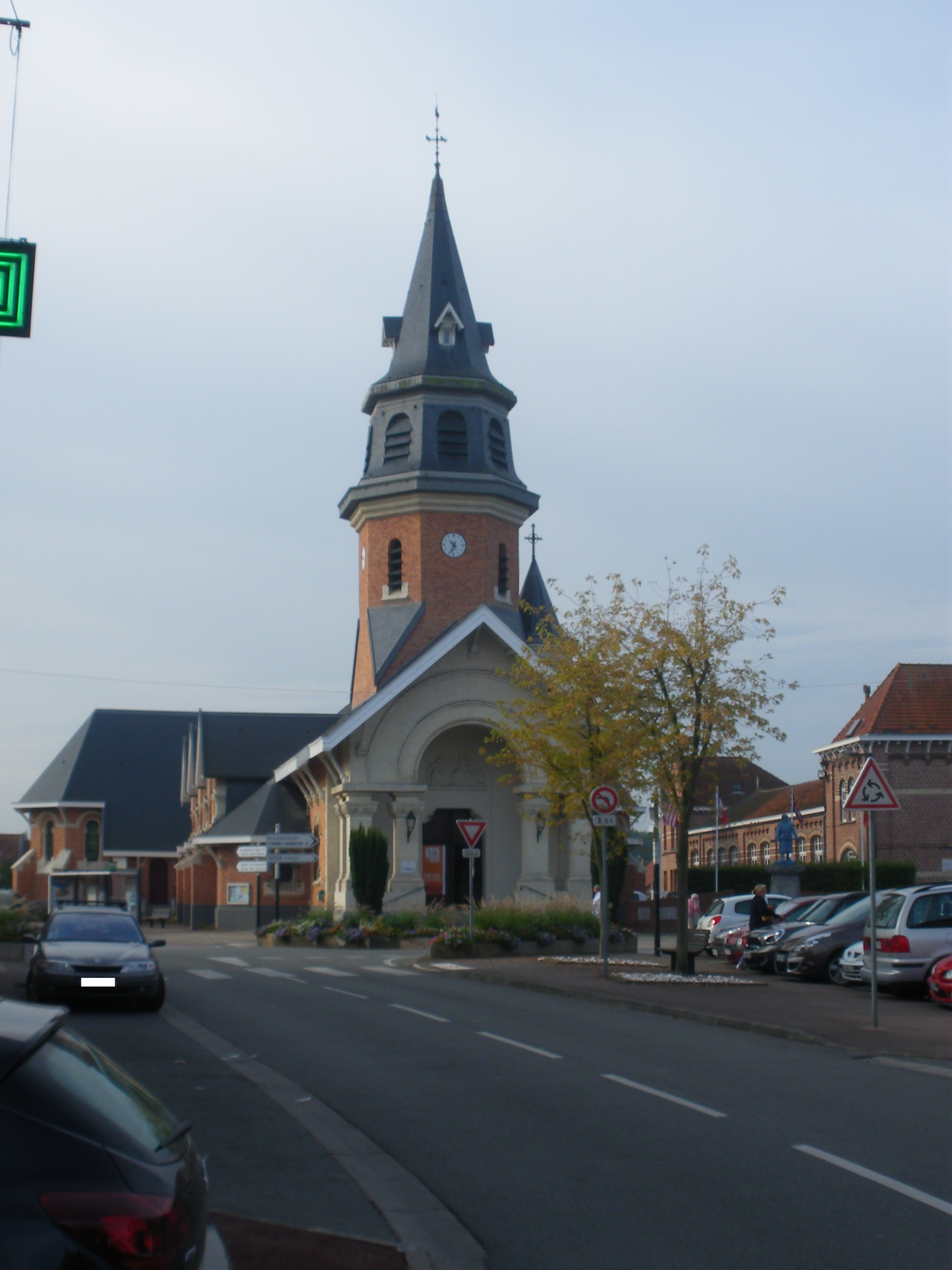
- The church in Frelinghien

- Coat of arms
- Location of Frelinghien
- Location within France Location within Hauts-de-France
- Coordinates: 50°42′45″N 2°56′06″E
- Country: France
- Region: Hauts-de-France
- Department: Nord
- Arrondissement: Lille
- Canton: Armentières
- Intercommunality: Métropole Européenne de Lille

Government
  - Mayor (2020–2026): Marie-Christine Fin
- Area^{1}: 11.27 km^{2} (4.35 sq mi)
- Elevation: 18 m (59 ft)
- Highest elevation: 20 m (66 ft)
- Lowest elevation: 14 m (46 ft)
- Population (2023): 2,609
  - Density: 231.5/km^{2} (599.6/sq mi)
- Time zone: UTC+01:00 (CET)
  - Summer (DST): UTC+02:00 (CEST)
- INSEE/Postal code: 59252 /59236
- ^{1} French Land Register data, which excludes lakes, ponds, glaciers > 1 km^{2} (0.386 sq mi or 247 acres) and river estuaries.

Frelinghien (French pronunciation: [fʁəlɛ̃ɡjɛ̃]; Dutch: Ferlingen) is a commune in the Nord department in northern France. It is part of the Métropole Européenne de Lille.

== Population ==
Historical population
Year	Pop.	±% p.a.
1968	1,703	—
1975	1,942	+1.89%
1982	2,181	+1.67%
1990	2,228	+0.27%
1999	2,395	+0.81%
2007	2,542	+0.75%
2012	2,438	−0.83%
2017	2,415	−0.19%
2023	2,609	+1.30%
Source: INSEE

== Heraldry ==
Arms of Frelinghien	The arms of Frelinghien are blazoned : Azure, the name 'Frelinghien' bendwise argent between 2 bendlets Or, and in sinister canton on an inescutcheon Or a lion sable.

== See also ==
- Communes of the Nord department
