= Quesnoy =

Quesnoy may refer to:

- Le Quesnoy, Nord, France
- Louvignies-Quesnoy, Nord, France
- Quesnoy-sur-Deûle, Nord, France
- Le Quesnoy-en-Artois, Pas-de-Calais, France
