= Le Gheer =

Coordinates: 50°44′0″N 2°54′0″E

Gheer is a hamlet of Wallonia in the municipality of Comines-Warneton, district of Warneton, located in the province of Hainaut, Belgium.

The hamlet is situated on the Warneton - Ploegsteert road, approximately 15 km south of Ypres .

The hamlet was completely destroyed in the First World War.
