= Warneton =

- Commune
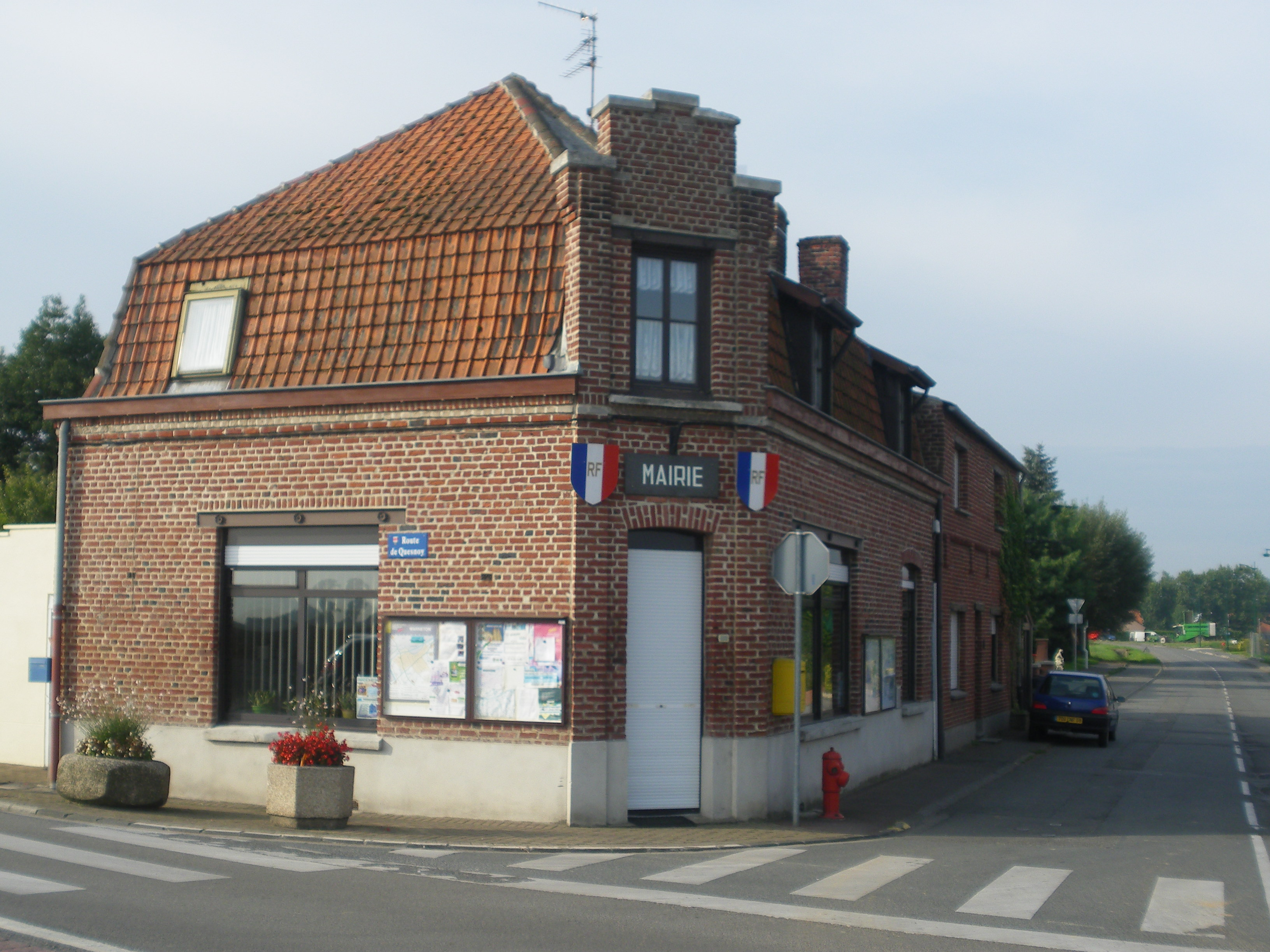
- The town hall in Warneton

- Coat of arms
- Location of Warneton
- Location within France Location within Hauts-de-France
- Coordinates: 50°44′52″N 2°57′12″E
- Country: France
- Region: Hauts-de-France
- Department: Nord
- Arrondissement: Lille
- Canton: Armentières
- Intercommunality: Métropole Européenne de Lille

Government
  - Mayor (2020–2026): Yvon Pétronin
- Area^{1}: 4.17 km^{2} (1.61 sq mi)
- Elevation: 20 m (66 ft)
- Highest elevation: 25 m (82 ft)
- Lowest elevation: 11 m (36 ft)
- Population (2023): 231
  - Density: 55.4/km^{2} (143/sq mi)
- Time zone: UTC+01:00 (CET)
  - Summer (DST): UTC+02:00 (CEST)
- INSEE/Postal code: 59643 /59560
- ^{1} French Land Register data, which excludes lakes, ponds, glaciers > 1 km^{2} (0.386 sq mi or 247 acres) and river estuaries.

Warneton (French pronunciation: [waʁnətɔ̃]; Dutch: Waasten) is a commune in the Nord department in northern France. It is part of the Métropole Européenne de Lille.

== Bounding communes and places ==
- Warneton, Belgium (part of Comines-Warneton)
- Comines, east
- Quesnoy-sur-Deûle, southeast
- Deûlémont, southwest

== History ==
The commune was formed on 1 July 1946 by the merger of the former communes Warneton-Sud and Warneton-Bas.

=== Heraldry ===
Arms of Warneton	The arms of Warneton are blazoned : Argent, a fess gules. (the Béthune family and the communes of Cuts, Rosny-sur-Seine, Warneton and Noyon use the same arms.)

== Population ==
Historical population
Year	Pop.	±% p.a.
1968	197	—
1975	198	+0.07%
1982	171	−2.07%
1990	179	+0.57%
1999	178	−0.06%
2007	189	+0.75%
2012	224	+3.46%
2017	239	+1.30%
2023	231	−0.57%
Source: INSEE

== Points of interest ==
- A blockhaus, used during the advance of the Maginot Line.

== People ==
- Saint John of Warneton
