= Warneton, Belgium =

Village of Wallonia, Belgium

Coordinates: 50°45′N 02°57′E

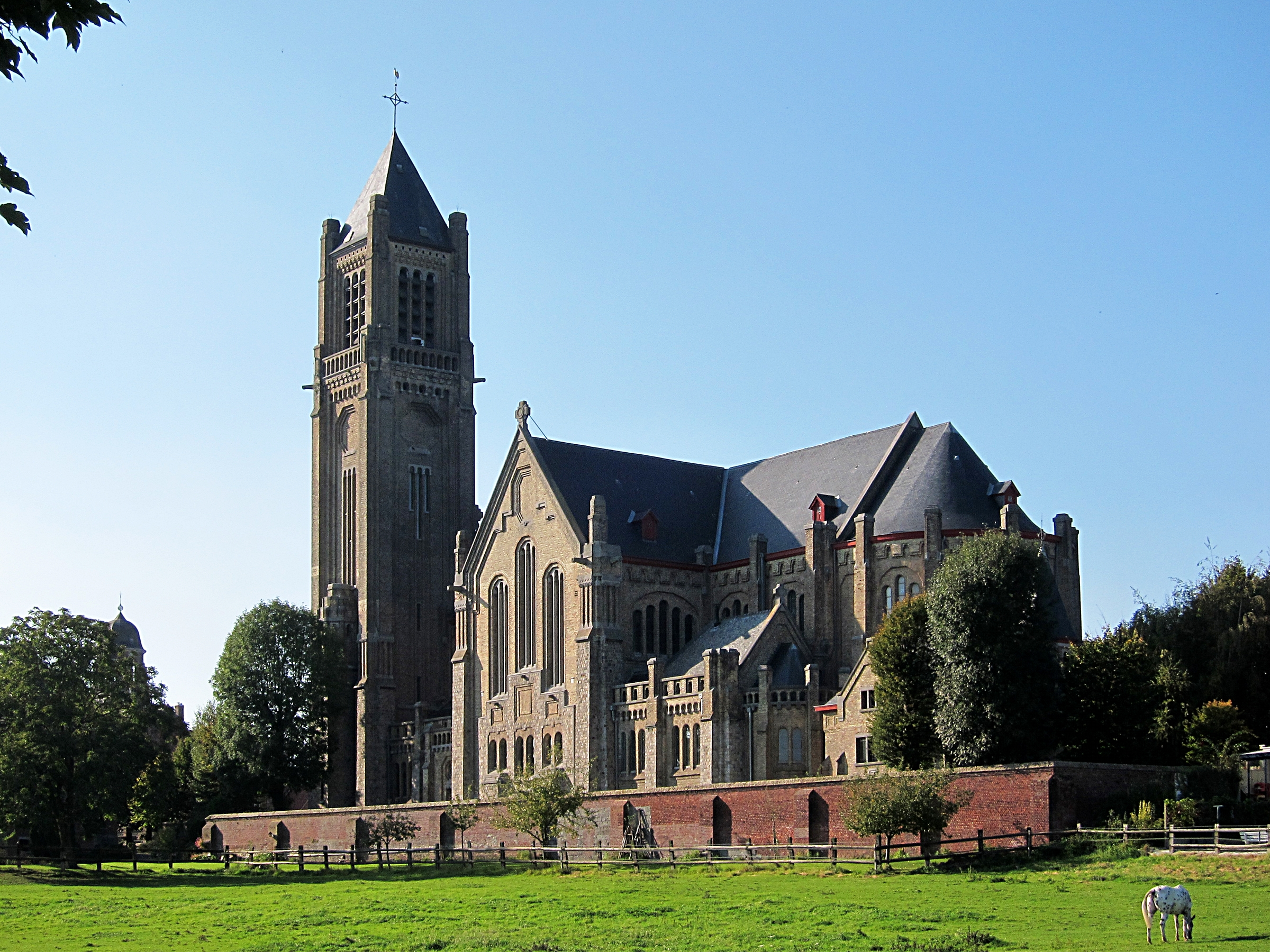
Church of Saints Peter and Paul

Warneton (Dutch: Waasten; Picard: Varnetån/Warneuton) is a village of Wallonia and a district of the municipality of Comines-Warneton, located in the province of Hainaut, Belgium.

It was a municipality of its own until the 1977 merger of Belgian municipalities.

It is immediately to the north of the French commune of Warneton, across the river Lys or Leie.

The hamlet of Gheer is on its territory.

== Etymology ==
- 1007 Uuarnasthun
- 1065 Uuarnestun
- 1104 Guarnestun
- 1168 Warnestun

Farm (Saxon thun, Germanic *tûna, "enclosure") of Warin, a Saxon and Frankish anthroponym (Saxon settlement set up in the Merovingian era).

== History ==
Cut away from Ploegsteert in 1850, it was transferred from the province of West Flanders to the province of Hainaut, in 1963. Since that date its minority Dutch-speaking inhabitants have benefitted from language facilities.
