= La Chapelle-d'Armentières =

- Commune
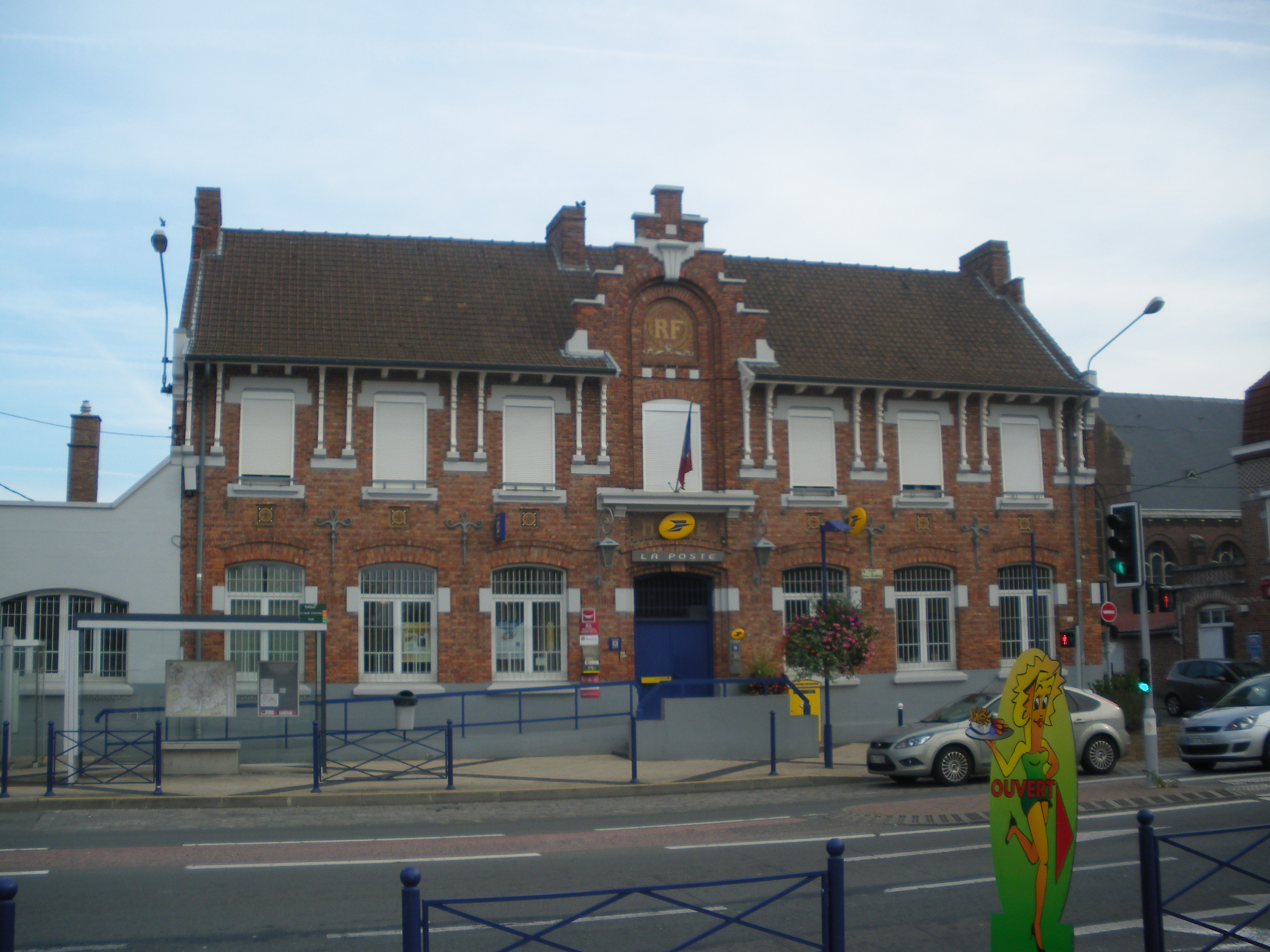
- The old town hall in La Chapelle-d'Armentières

- Coat of arms
- Location of La Chapelle-d'Armentières
- Location within France Location within Hauts-de-France
- Coordinates: 50°40′25″N 2°53′46″E
- Country: France
- Region: Hauts-de-France
- Department: Nord
- Arrondissement: Lille
- Canton: Armentières
- Intercommunality: Métropole Européenne de Lille

Government
  - Mayor (2020–2026): Damien Braure
- Area^{1}: 10.33 km^{2} (3.99 sq mi)
- Elevation: 18 m (59 ft)
- Highest elevation: 20 m (66 ft)
- Lowest elevation: 15 m (49 ft)
- Population (2023): 8,754
  - Density: 847.4/km^{2} (2,195/sq mi)
- Time zone: UTC+01:00 (CET)
  - Summer (DST): UTC+02:00 (CEST)
- INSEE/Postal code: 59143 /59930
- ^{1} French Land Register data, which excludes lakes, ponds, glaciers > 1 km^{2} (0.386 sq mi or 247 acres) and river estuaries.

La Chapelle-d'Armentières (French pronunciation: [la ʃapɛl daʁmɑ̃tjɛʁ]; Dutch: Armentiers-Kapelle) is a commune of the Nord department in northern France. It is part of the Métropole Européenne de Lille.

== Population ==
Historical population
Year	Pop.	±% p.a.
1968	5,300	—
1975	6,080	+1.98%
1982	6,703	+1.40%
1990	7,825	+1.95%
1999	7,903	+0.11%
2007	7,881	−0.03%
2012	8,390	+1.26%
2017	8,590	+0.47%
2023	8,754	+0.32%
Source: INSEE

== Heraldry ==
Arms of La Chapelle-d'Armentières	The arms of La Chapelle-d'Armentières are blazoned : Argent, a fleurs de lys gules, between in chief a sun and a crescent bendwise sinister Or, in center point overall, a church portal sable.

== See also ==
- Communes of the Nord department
