= Pérenchies =

- Commune
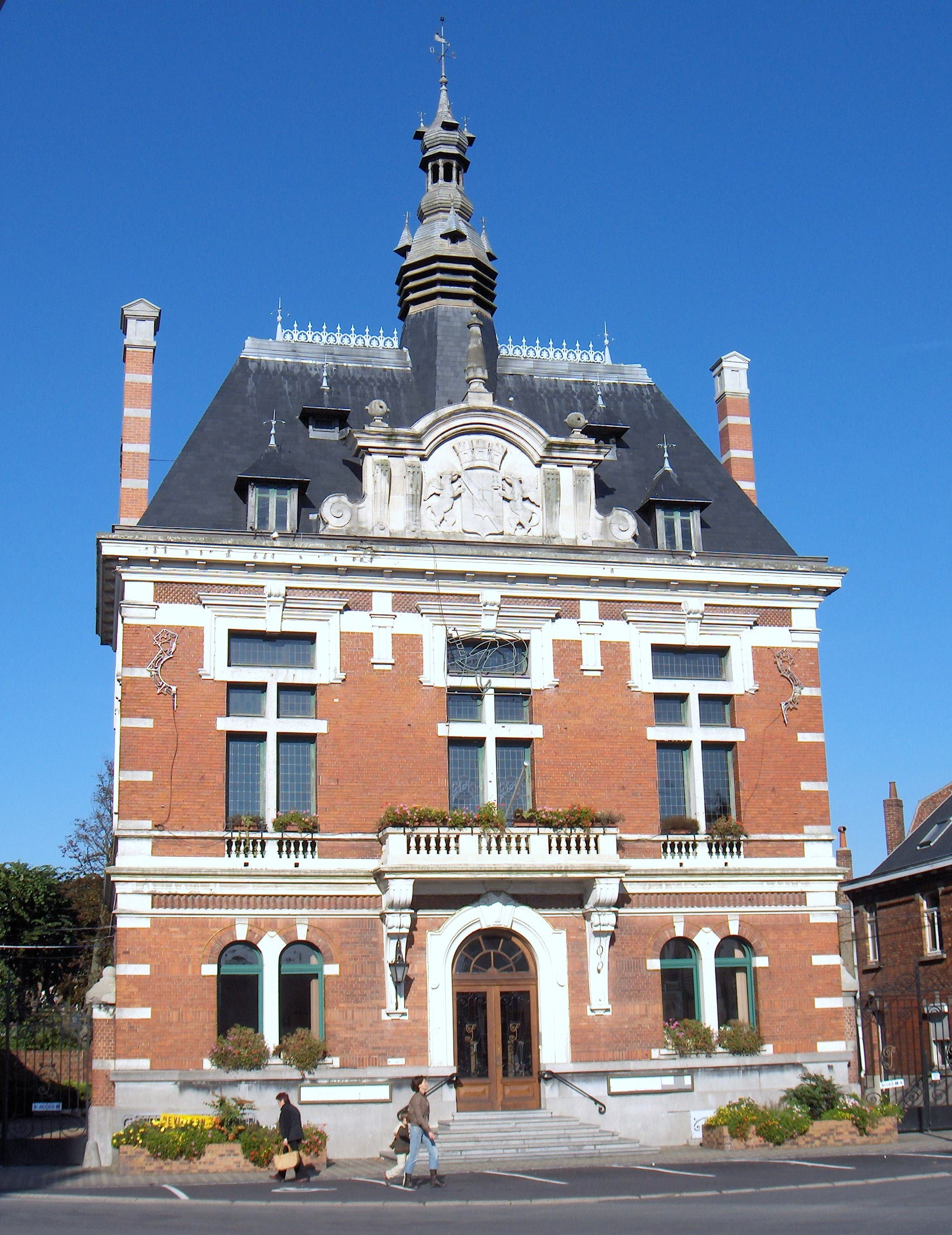
- The town hall in Pérenchies

- Coat of arms
- Location of Pérenchies
- Location within France Location within Hauts-de-France
- Coordinates: 50°40′07″N 2°58′23″E
- Country: France
- Region: Hauts-de-France
- Department: Nord
- Arrondissement: Lille
- Canton: Armentières
- Intercommunality: Métropole Européenne de Lille

Government
  - Mayor (2023–2026): Karim Louzani
- Area^{1}: 3.03 km^{2} (1.17 sq mi)
- Elevation: 30 m (98 ft)
- Highest elevation: 38 m (125 ft)
- Lowest elevation: 19 m (62 ft)
- Population (2023): 8,455
  - Density: 2,790/km^{2} (7,230/sq mi)
- Time zone: UTC+01:00 (CET)
  - Summer (DST): UTC+02:00 (CEST)
- INSEE/Postal code: 59457 /59840
- ^{1} French Land Register data, which excludes lakes, ponds, glaciers > 1 km^{2} (0.386 sq mi or 247 acres) and river estuaries.

Pérenchies (French pronunciation: [peʁɑ̃ʃi]; Dutch: Perensijs) is a commune in the Nord department in northern France. It is part of the Métropole Européenne de Lille.

== Population ==
Historical population
Year	Pop.	±% p.a.
1968	5,570	—
1975	6,858	+3.02%
1982	6,926	+0.14%
1990	7,186	+0.46%
1999	7,639	+0.68%
2007	7,801	+0.26%
2012	8,289	+1.22%
2017	8,424	+0.32%
2023	8,455	+0.06%
Source: INSEE

== Heraldry ==
Arms of Pérenchies	The arms of Pérenchies are blazoned : Vert, an inescutcheon argent, overall a bend compony gules and argent.

== People from Pérenchies ==
- Yvonne Abbas (1922-2014), French Resistance worker

== See also ==
- Communes of the Nord department
