= Comines-Warneton =

City in Hainaut Province, Wallonia, Belgium

Comines-Warneton Comène-Warneuton (Picard)
- Municipality
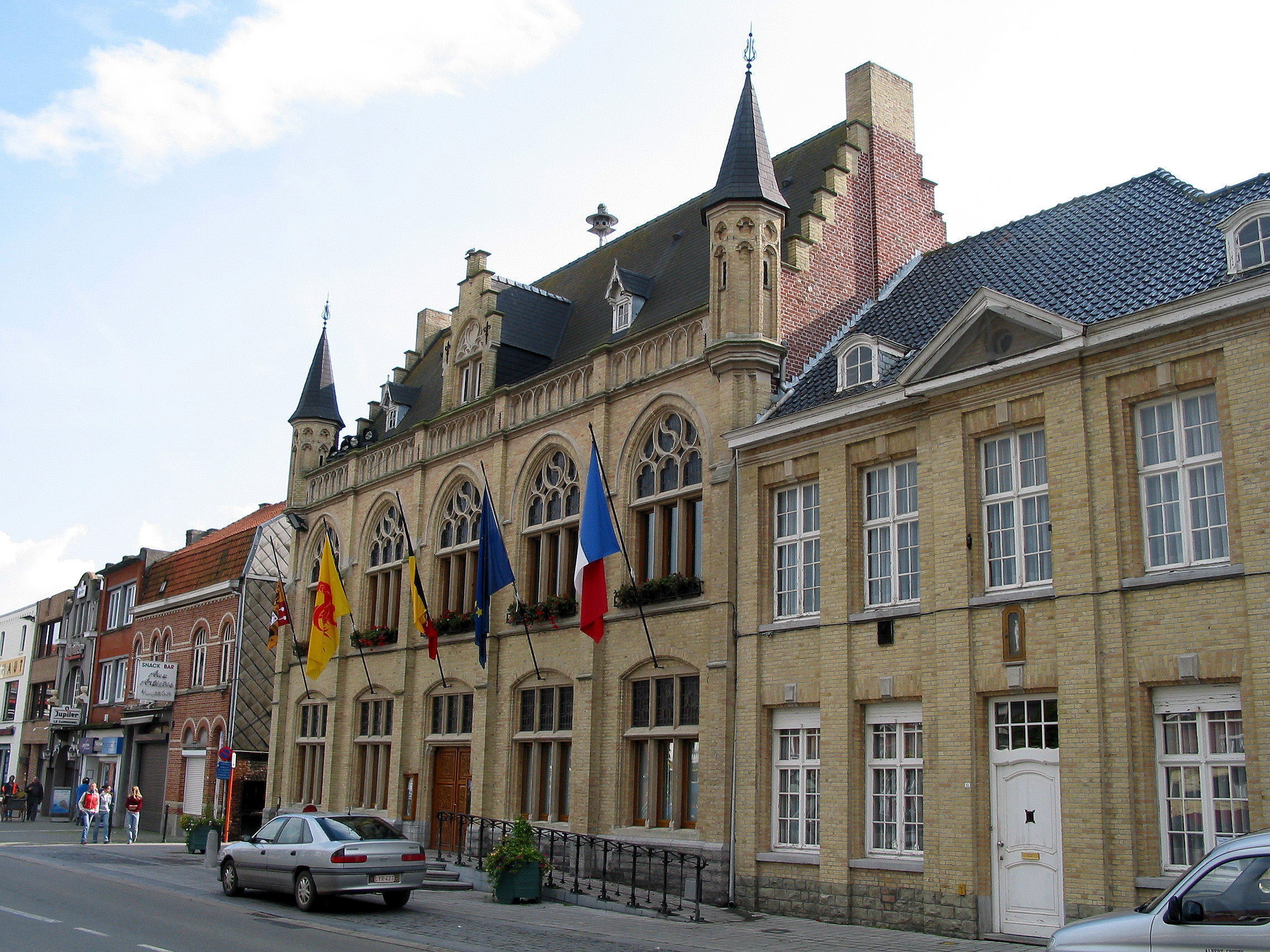
- Comines-Warneton town hall

- Flag Coat of arms

- Location of Comines-Warneton in Hainaut
- Interactive map of Comines-Warneton
- Location in Belgium
- Coordinates: 50°46′N 03°00′E
- Country: Belgium
- Community: French Community
- Region: Wallonia
- Province: Hainaut
- Arrondissement: Tournai-Mouscron

Government
  - Mayor: Alice Leeuwerck
  - Governing parties: Ensemble (MR), Ecolo, MCI

Area
  - Total: 61.34 km^{2} (23.68 sq mi)

Population (2018-01-01)
  - Total: 18,063
  - Density: 294.5/km^{2} (762.7/sq mi)
- Postal codes: 7780-7784
- NIS code: 57097
- Area codes: 056
- Website: www.villedecomines-warneton.be

Comines-Warneton (French: [kɔmin waʁnətɔ̃]; Dutch: Komen-Waasten [ˈkoːmə(ɱ) ˈʋaːstə(n)]; Picard: Comène-Warneuton; West Flemish: Koomn-Woastn; Walloon: Cômene-Varneton) is a city and municipality of Wallonia located in the province of Hainaut, Belgium. It is contiguous with the identically named Comines on the other side of the border with France.

On 1 January 2006 it had a total population of 17,562. Its total area is 61.09 km^{2} (23.59 sq mi) which gives a population density of 287 inhabitants per square kilometre (740/sq mi). The name "Comines" is believed to have a Celtic, or Gaulish, origin. Comines-Warneton is a municipality with language facilities for Dutch-speakers.

The municipality consists of the following districts: Bas-Warneton, Comines, Houthem, Ploegsteert, and Warneton (including the hamlet of Gheer). They were all transferred in 1963 from the arrondissement of Ypres in the Dutch-speaking province of West Flanders to the newly created arrondissement of Mouscron in French-speaking Hainaut. The five municipalities (Comines, Houthem, Ploegsteert, Bas-Warneton, Warneton) were merged into a single Comines-Warneton municipality in 1977. Since then, the municipality forms an exclave of both Hainaut and Wallonia, being surrounded by the Flemish province of West Flanders and the French department of Nord and not connected to the rest of the French-speaking area of Belgium.

Comines-Warneton is twinned with Hedge End in England and with Argenton-les-Vallées in France.

== Famous inhabitants ==
- Johannes Despauterius, humanist
- Frank Vandenbroucke, cyclist
- Gustave Singier, painter
- Eugene Joseph Verboeckhoven, painter

== Twin towns ==
- Hedge End, England, United Kingdom
- São João das Lampas, Portugal

== See also ==
- Voeren, a similarly detached part of Flanders.
