= Deûlémont =

- Commune
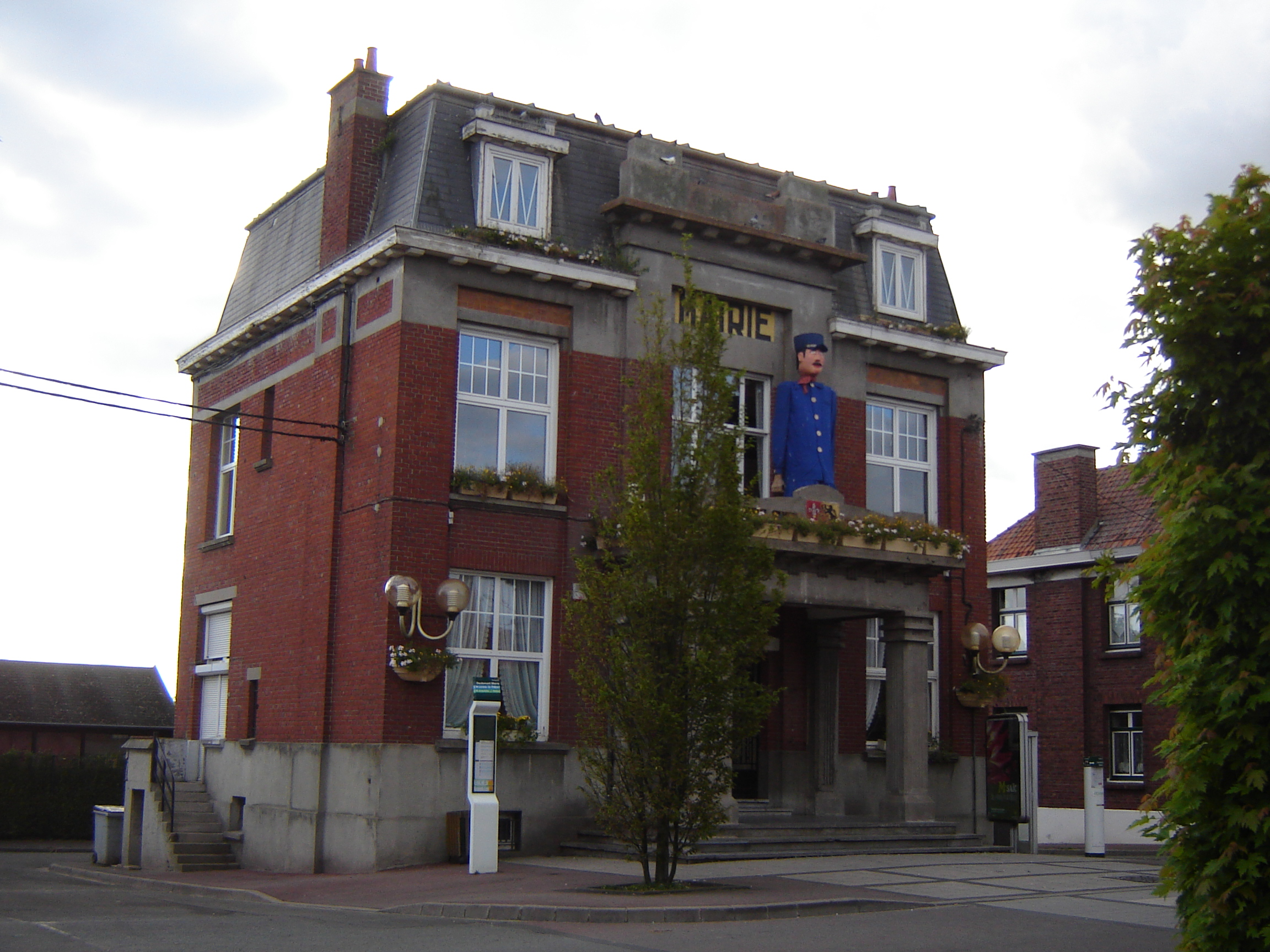
- The town hall in Deûlémont

- Coat of arms
- Location of Deûlémont
- Location within France Location within Hauts-de-France
- Coordinates: 50°44′06″N 2°56′57″E
- Country: France
- Region: Hauts-de-France
- Department: Nord
- Arrondissement: Lille
- Canton: Armentières
- Intercommunality: Métropole Européenne de Lille

Government
  - Mayor (2020–2026): Christophe Liénart
- Area^{1}: 9.94 km^{2} (3.84 sq mi)
- Elevation: 16 m (52 ft)
- Highest elevation: 20 m (66 ft)
- Lowest elevation: 11 m (36 ft)
- Population (2023): 1,778
  - Density: 179/km^{2} (463/sq mi)
- Time zone: UTC+01:00 (CET)
  - Summer (DST): UTC+02:00 (CEST)
- INSEE/Postal code: 59173 /59890
- ^{1} French Land Register data, which excludes lakes, ponds, glaciers > 1 km^{2} (0.386 sq mi or 247 acres) and river estuaries.

Deûlémont (French pronunciation: [dølemɔ̃]; from Dutch: Deulemonde) is a commune in the Nord department in northern France. Situated at the confluence of the rivers Deûle and Lys, it is part of the Métropole Européenne de Lille.

== Heraldry ==
Arms of Deûlémont	The arms of Deûlémont are blazoned : Quarterly 1&4: Gules, a fleur de lys argent; 2&3: Or, a lion sable, langued gules; overall a crozier; and over that an inescutcheon Or charged with a créquier gules. (a créquier is a French charge - a tree with 7 branches, each ending in a single leaf.)

== See also ==
- Communes of the Nord department

== Notable people ==
- Jules Leman (1826–1880), priest and schoolmaster
