= 2009 Paris–Roubaix =

2009 UCI World Ranking, race 8 of 24
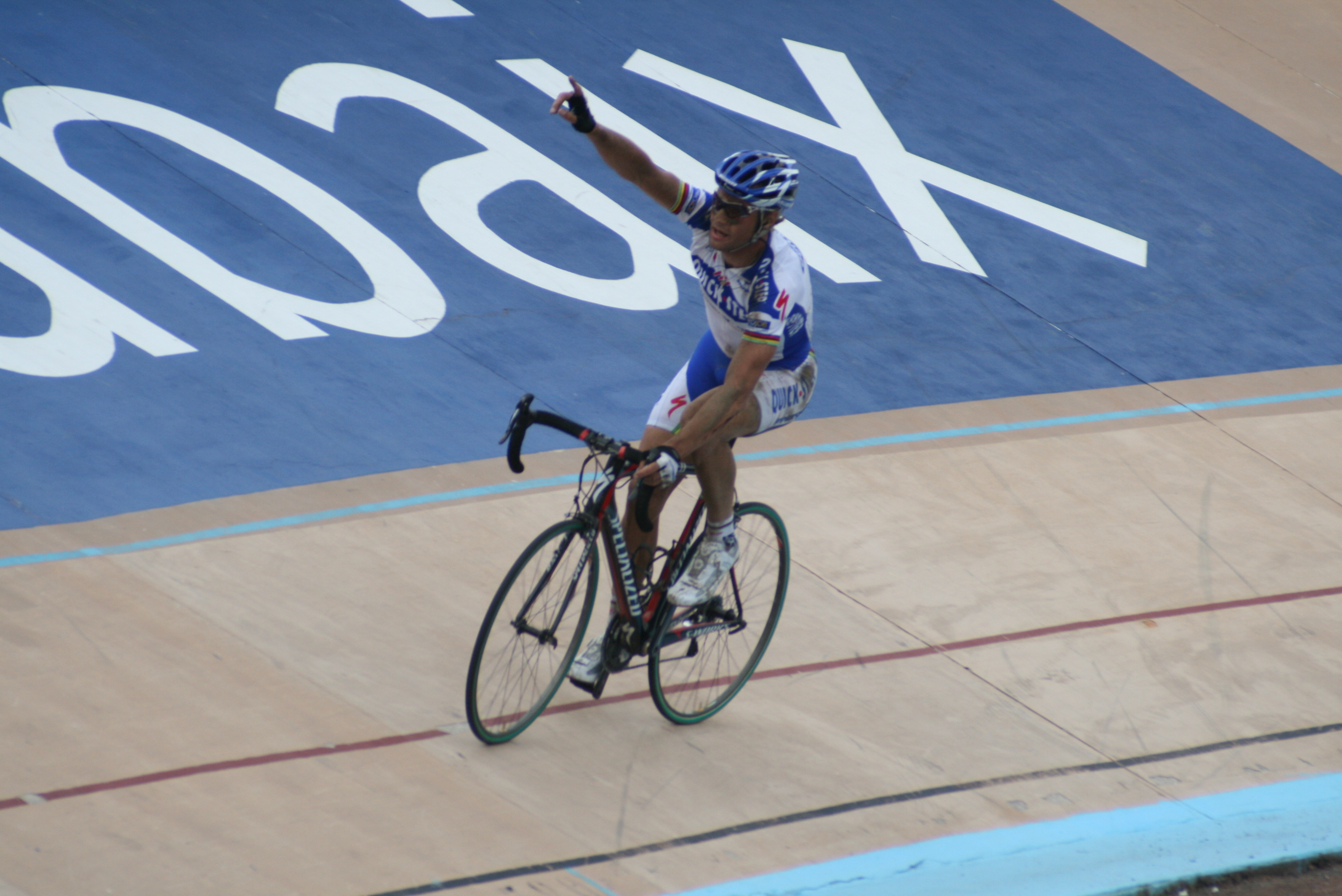

Race details
- Dates: April 12, 2009
- Stages: 1
- Distance: 259 km (160.9 mi)
- Winning time: 6h 15' 54"

Results
	Winner	Tom Boonen (Belgium)	(Quick-Step)
	Second	Filippo Pozzato (Italy)	(Team Katusha)
	Third	Thor Hushovd (Norway)	(Cervélo TestTeam)

The 2009 Paris–Roubaix was the 107th running of the Paris–Roubaix single-day cycling race, often known as the Hell of the North. It was held on 12 April 2009 over a distance of 259 kilometres (160.9 miles).

The race was won by Tom Boonen of Quick-Step for the third time, having won the 2005 and 2008 editions of the race. Boonen finished the race alone, seconds ahead of Filippo Pozzato. Thor Hushovd arrived third, to round out the podium. The race was the eighth event in the inaugural UCI World Ranking series.

== Race summary ==
Before the race, favourites included 2008 winner Tom Boonen, teammate and Tour of Flanders winner Stijn Devolder, Garmin–Slipstream's Martijn Maaskant, and 2006 winner, Fabian Cancellara.

A group of 11 riders formed the early breakaway, but it was caught again with still about 60 kilometres to go. Six riders then eventually broke away from the rest of the peloton: Tom Boonen, Juan Antonio Flecha, Leif Hoste, Thor Hushovd, Filippo Pozzato and Johan Van Summeren. At Carrefour de l'Arbre, about 15 kilometres from the finish, Flecha crashed and took Hoste with him in his fall. Van Summeren and Pozzato were held back which allowed Boonen and Hushovd to break away. However, just a few hundred metres further, Hushovd also crashed and Boonen continued on his own. Pozzato came to within 10 seconds but never managed to close the gap, allowing Boonen to win. Nearly all of the riders featured in the top ten endured at least a minor crash.

During the race an official motorcycle crashed into the crowd injuring 16 people, four seriously. Three of the injured were flown by helicopter to hospitals in northern France.

== Results ==
Results (1–10)
	Cyclist	Team	Time
1	Tom Boonen (BEL)	Quick-Step	6h 15'54"
2	Filippo Pozzato (ITA)	Team Katusha	+ 47"
3	Thor Hushovd (NOR)	Cervélo TestTeam	+ 1'17"
DSQ	~~Leif Hoste~~ (BEL)	~~Silence–Lotto~~	+ 1'17"
4	Johan Vansummeren (BEL)	Silence–Lotto	+ 1'22"
5	Juan Antonio Flecha (ESP)	Rabobank	+ 2'14"
6	Heinrich Haussler (GER)	Cervélo TestTeam	+ 3'13"
7	Sylvain Chavanel (FRA)	Quick-Step	+ 3'15"
8	Manuel Quinziato (ITA)	Liquigas	+ 5'00"
9	Matti Breschel (DEN)	Team Saxo Bank	+ 5'29"
10	Wouter Weylandt (BEL)	Quick-Step	+ 5'29"

== The cobblestones ==
Section	Kilometers	Place	Length (km)
28	98	Troisvilles > Inchy	2.2
27	104.5	Viesly > Quiévy	1.8
26	107	Quiévy > Saint-Python	3.7
25	112	Saint-Python	1.5
24	119.5	Vertain > Saint-Martin-sur-Écaillon	1.9
23	126.5	Capelle-sur-Écaillon> Le-Bruat	1.7
22	138.5	Verchain-Maugré > Quérénaing	1.6
21	141.5	Quérénaing > Maing	2.5
20	144.5	Maing > Monchaux-sur-Écaillon	1.6
19	156	Haveluy > Wallers	2.5
18	164	Trouée d'Arenberg	2.5
17	170.5	Wallers > Hélesmes	1.6
16	177	Hornaing > Wandignies-Hamage	3.7
15	184.5	Warlaing > Brillon	2.4
14	188	Tilloy > Sars-et-Rosières	2.4
13	194.5	Beuvry-la-forêt > Orchies	1.4
12	199.5	Orchies	1.7
11	205.5	Auchy-lez-Orchies > Bersée	1.2
10	211	Mons-en-Pévèle	3
9	217	Mérignes > Pont-à-Marcq	0.7
8	220	Pont-Thibaut > Ennevelin	1.4
7	225.5	Templeuve > L'Épinette	0.2
7	226	Templeuve > Moulin-de-Vertain	0.5
6	232.5	Cysoing > Bourghelles	1.3
6	235	Bourghelles > Wannehain	1.1
5	239.5	Camphin-en-Pévèle	1.8
4	242.5	Carrefour de l'Arbre	2.1
3	244.5	Gruson	1.1
2	251.5	Hem	1.4
1	258	Roubaix	0.3
