= 2014 Paris–Roubaix =

2014 UCI World Tour, race 10 of 28
- Official event poster

Race details
- Dates: 13 April 2014
- Stages: 1
- Distance: 257 km (160 mi)
- Winning time: 6h 09' 01"

Results
	Winner	Niki Terpstra (NED)	(Omega Pharma–Quick-Step)
	Second	John Degenkolb (GER)	(Giant–Shimano)
	Third	Fabian Cancellara (SUI)	(Trek Factory Racing)

The 2014 Paris–Roubaix was the 112th edition of the Paris–Roubaix race, that took place on 13 April 2014, over a distance of 257 kilometres (159.7 miles) and was the tenth race of the 2014 UCI World Tour. The race was won by Niki Terpstra of the Omega Pharma–Quick-Step team, after he attacked from a small group of riders with around 6 km (3.7 mi) remaining. He finished 20 seconds clear of the remainder of the group, led home by Giant–Shimano's John Degenkolb and Fabian Cancellara of Trek Factory Racing, the race's defending winner.

== Cobbled sectors ==
Section Number	Name	Kilometre Marker	Length (in m)	Category
28	Troisvilles to Inchy	97.5	2200	*
27	Viesly to Quiévy	104	1800	*
26	Quievy to Saint Python	106.5	3700	*
25	Saint-Python	111	1500	*
24	Solesmes to Haussy	119.5	800	*
23	Saulzoir to Verchain-Maugré	126	1200	*
22	Verchain-Maugré to Quérénaing	130.5	1600	*
21	Quérénaing to Famars	135	1200	*
20	Maing to Monchaux-sur-Écaillon	140.5	1600	*
19	Haveluy to Wallers	153	2500	*
18	Trouée d'Arenberg	161.5	2400	*
17	Wallers to Hélesmes	167.5	1600	*
16	Hornaing to Wandigniess	174.5	3700	*
15	Warlaing to Brillon	182	2400	*
14	Tilloy to Sars-et-Rosières	185	2400	*
13	Beuvry-la-Forêt to Orchies	191.5	1400	*
12	Orchies	196.5	1700	*
11	Auchy-lez-Orchies to Bersée	202.5	2700	*
10	Mons-en-Pévèle	208	3000	*
9	Mérignies to Avelin	214	700	*
8	Pont-Thibaut to Ennevelin	217.5	1400	*
7	Templeuve – Moulin-de-Vertain	223.5	500	*
6	Cysoing to Bourghelles	230	1300	*
6	Bourghelles to Wannehain	232.5	1100	*
5	Camphin-en-Pévèle	237	1800	*
4	Carrefour de l'Arbre	240	2100	*
3	Gruson	242	1100	*
2	Willems to Hem	249	1400	*
1	Roubaix (Espace Crupelandt)	256	300	*
Total cobbled sections			51100	

== Teams ==
As Paris–Roubaix was a UCI World Tour event, all 18 UCI ProTeams were invited automatically and obligated to send a squad. Seven other squads were given wildcard places, thus completing the 25-team peloton.

The 25 teams that competed in the race were:

- Ag2r–La Mondiale
- Astana
- Belkin Pro Cycling
- BMC Racing Team
- Bretagne–Séché Environnement
- Cannondale
- Cofidis
- Team Europcar
- FDJ.fr
- Garmin–Sharp
- Giant–Shimano
- IAM Cycling
- Team Katusha
- Lampre–Merida
- Lotto–Belisol
- Movistar Team
- NetApp–Endura
- Omega Pharma–Quick-Step
- Orica–GreenEDGE
- Team Sky
- Tinkoff–Saxo
- Topsport Vlaanderen–Baloise
- Trek Factory Racing
- UnitedHealthcare
- Wanty–Groupe Gobert

== Results ==
	Cyclist	Team	Time	UCI World Tour Points
1	Niki Terpstra (NED)	Omega Pharma–Quick-Step	6h 09' 01"	100
2	John Degenkolb (GER)	Giant–Shimano	+ 20"	80
3	Fabian Cancellara (SUI)	Trek Factory Racing	+ 20"	70
4	Sep Vanmarcke (BEL)	Belkin Pro Cycling	+ 20"	60
5	Zdeněk Štybar (CZE)	Omega Pharma–Quick-Step	+ 20"	50
6	Peter Sagan (SVK)	Cannondale	+ 20"	40
7	Geraint Thomas (GBR)	Team Sky	+ 20"	30
8	Sebastian Langeveld (NED)	Garmin–Sharp	+ 20"	20
9	Bradley Wiggins (GBR)	Team Sky	+ 20"	10
10	Tom Boonen (BEL)	Omega Pharma–Quick-Step	+ 20"	4
