= 2008 Paris–Roubaix =

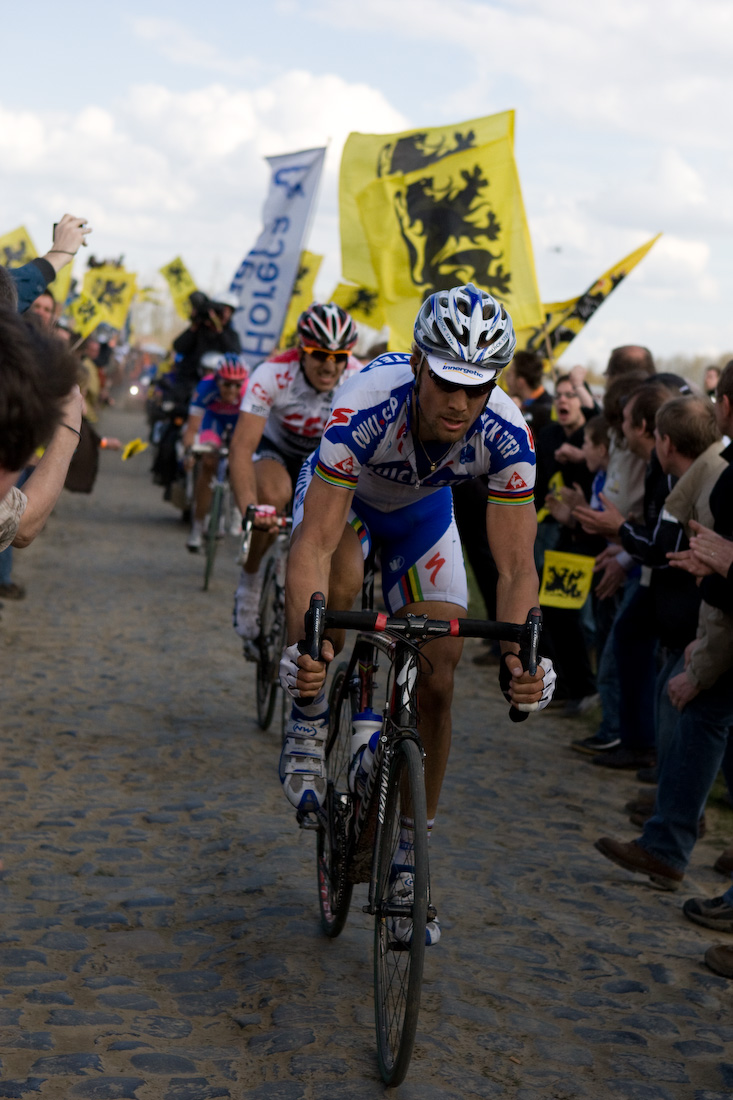
- Tom Boonen at the 2008 Paris–Roubaix

Race details
- Dates: April 13, 2008
- Stages: 1
- Distance: 259 km (160.9 mi)
- Winning time: 5h 58' 42"

Results
	Winner	Tom Boonen (BEL)	(Quick-Step)
	Second	Fabian Cancellara (SUI)	(Team CSC)
	Third	Alessandro Ballan (ITA)	(Lampre)

The 2008 Paris–Roubaix was the 106th running of the Paris–Roubaix single-day cycling race, often known as the Hell of the North. It was held on 13 April 2008 over a distance of 259 kilometres (160.9 miles). Tom Boonen of the Quick-Step team won in a sprint inside the Roubaix velodrome. Fabian Cancellara was a close second and Alessandro Ballan came third.

== Results ==
April 13, 2008, Compiègne > Roubaix, 259 km (161 mi)

Results (1–10)
	Cyclist	Team	Time
1	Tom Boonen (BEL)	Quick-Step	5h 58' 42"
2	Fabian Cancellara (SUI)	Team CSC	s.t.
3	Alessandro Ballan (ITA)	Lampre	s.t.
4	Martijn Maaskant (NED)	Slipstream–Chipotle	+ 3' 39"
5	Stuart O'Grady (AUS)	Team CSC	+ 3' 57"
6	Leif Hoste (BEL)	Silence–Lotto	s.t.
7	Stijn Devolder (BEL)	Quick-Step	+ 3' 59"
8	Johan van Summeren (BEL)	Silence–Lotto	+ 4' 35"
9	George Hincapie (USA)	Team High Road	+ 5' 12"
10	Fabio Baldato (ITA)	Lampre	s.t.

== The cobblestones ==
Section	Kilometers	Place	Length
28	98	Troisvilles > Inchy	2.2
27	104.5	Viesly > Quiévy	1.8
26	107	Quiévy > Saint-Python	3.7
25	112	Saint-Python	1.5
24	119.5	Vertain > Saint-Martin-sur-Écaillon	1.9
23	126.5	Capelle-sur-Écaillon> Le-Buat	1.7
22	138.5	Verchain-Maugré > Quérénaing	1.6
21	141.5	Quérénaing > Maing	2.5
20	144.5	Maing > Monchaux-sur-Écaillon	1.6
19	156	Haveluy > Wallers	2.5
18	164	Trouée d'Arenberg	2.4
17	170.5	Wallers > Hélesmes	1.6
16	177	Hornaing > Wandignies-Hamage	3.7
15	184.5	Warlaing > Brillon	2.4
14	188	Tilloy > Sars-et-Rosières	2.4
13	194.5	Beuvry-la-forêt > Orchies	1.4
12	199.5	Orchies	1.7
11	205.5	Auchy-lez-Orchies > Bersée	1.2
10	211	Mons-en-Pévèle	3
9	217	Mérignes > Pont-à-Marcq	0.7
8	220	Pont-Thibaut > Ennevelin	1.4
7	225.5	Templeuve > L'Épinette	0.2
7	226	Templeuve > Moulin-de-Vertain	0.5
6	232.5	Cysoing > Bourghelles	1.3
6	235	Bourghelles > Wannehain	1.1
5	239.5	Camphin-en-Pévèle	1.8
4	242.5	Carrefour de l'Arbre	2.1
3	244.5	Gruson	1.1
2	251.5	Hem	1.4
1	258	Roubaix	0.3
