= Cysoing =

- Commune
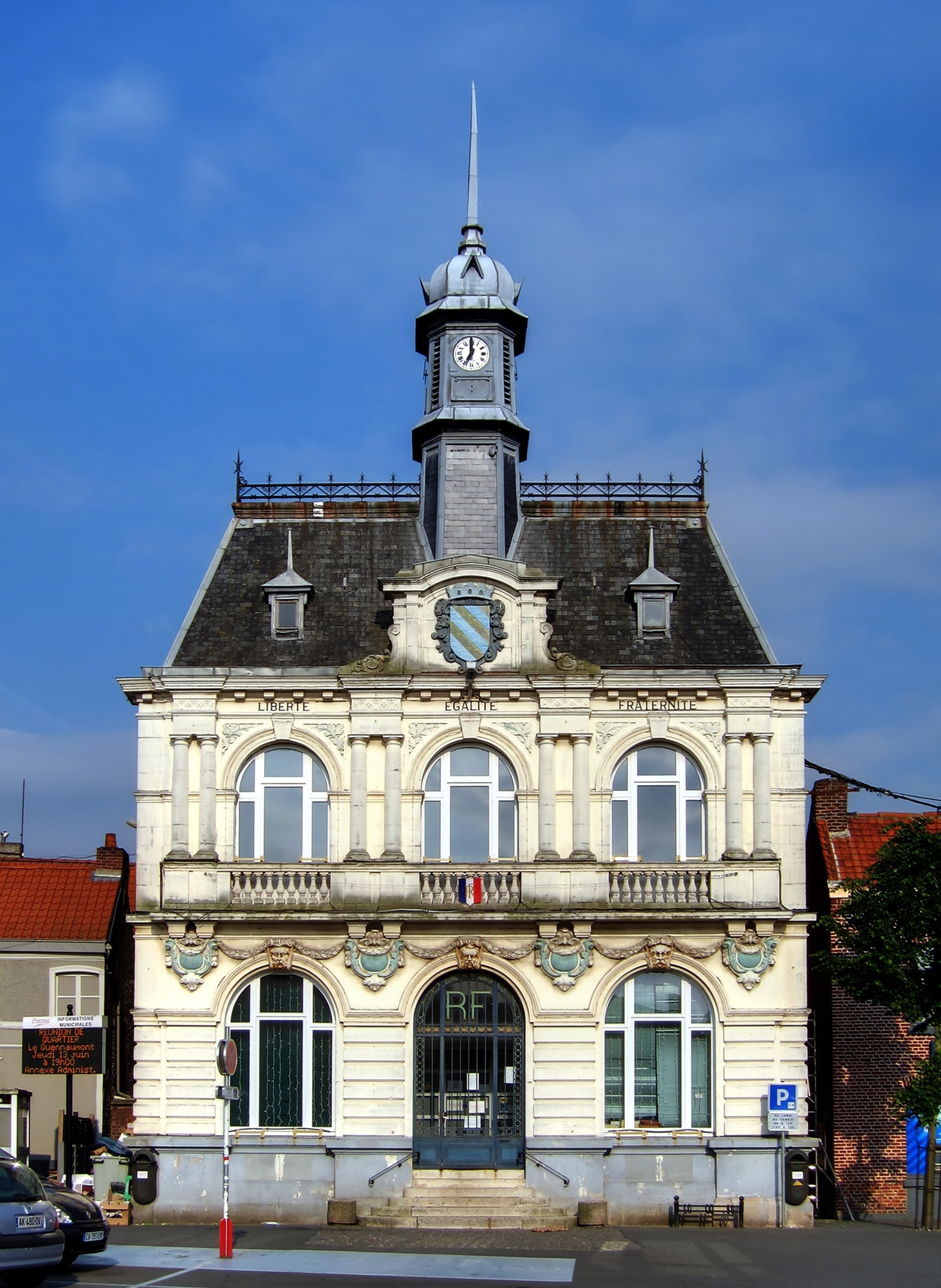
- Cysoing in the arrondissement of Lille

- Coat of arms
- Location of Cysoing
- Location within France Location within Hauts-de-France
- Coordinates: 50°34′09″N 3°12′57″E
- Country: France
- Region: Hauts-de-France
- Department: Nord
- Arrondissement: Lille
- Canton: Templeuve-en-Pévèle
- Intercommunality: Pévèle-Carembault

Government
  - Mayor (2020–2026): Benjamin Dumortier
- Area^{1}: 13.62 km^{2} (5.26 sq mi)
- Elevation: 43 m (141 ft)
- Highest elevation: 56 m (184 ft)
- Lowest elevation: 26 m (85 ft)
- Population (2023): 4,839
  - Density: 355.3/km^{2} (920.2/sq mi)
- Time zone: UTC+01:00 (CET)
  - Summer (DST): UTC+02:00 (CEST)
- INSEE/Postal code: 59168 /59830
- ^{1} French Land Register data, which excludes lakes, ponds, glaciers > 1 km^{2} (0.386 sq mi or 247 acres) and river estuaries.

Cysoing (French pronunciation: [sizwɛ̃]) is a commune in the Nord department in northern France, 15 km (9.3 mi) southeast of Lille. It is twinned with the English town of Much Wenlock. An obsolete spelling is Cisoin.

== Heraldry ==
Arms of Cysoing	The arms of Cysoing are blazoned : Bendy Or and azure. (Baisieux, Bouvines and Cysoing use the same arms.)

== Population ==
Historical population
Year	Pop.	±% p.a.
1968	3,460	—
1975	3,531	+0.29%
1982	3,454	−0.31%
1990	3,699	+0.86%
1999	4,218	+1.47%
2007	4,416	+0.58%
2012	4,757	+1.50%
2017	4,968	+0.87%
2023	4,839	−0.44%
Source: INSEE

== Bordering municipalities ==
Cysoing is bordered by Bouvines, Sainghin-en-Mélantois, Gruson, Camphin-en-Pévèle, Bourghelles, Cobrieux, Genech, Louvil, Templeuve-en-Pévèle, and Péronne-en-Mélantois.

== See also ==
- Communes of the Nord department
- Souvenir Henri Desgrange
