= Mouchin =

- Commune
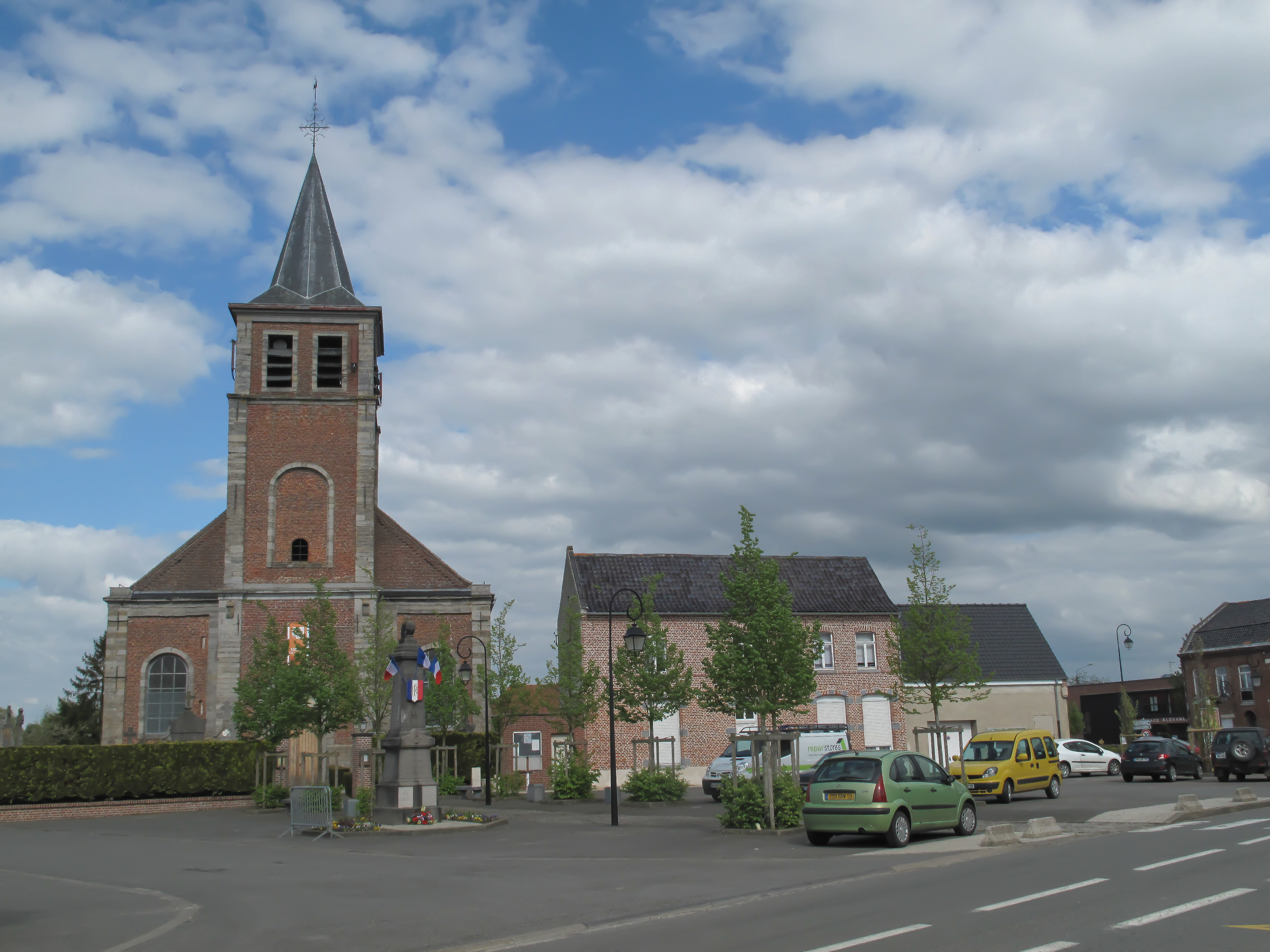
- Mouchin, church

- Coat of arms
- Location of Mouchin
- Location within France Location within Hauts-de-France
- Coordinates: 50°31′07″N 3°17′32″E
- Country: France
- Region: Hauts-de-France
- Department: Nord
- Arrondissement: Lille
- Canton: Templeuve-en-Pévèle
- Intercommunality: Pévèle-Carembault

Government
  - Mayor (2020–2026): Christian Devaux
- Area^{1}: 9.19 km^{2} (3.55 sq mi)
- Elevation: 50 m (160 ft)
- Highest elevation: 54 m (177 ft)
- Lowest elevation: 23 m (75 ft)
- Population (2023): 1,491
  - Density: 162/km^{2} (420/sq mi)
- Time zone: UTC+01:00 (CET)
  - Summer (DST): UTC+02:00 (CEST)
- INSEE/Postal code: 59419 /59310
- ^{1} French Land Register data, which excludes lakes, ponds, glaciers > 1 km^{2} (0.386 sq mi or 247 acres) and river estuaries.

Mouchin (French pronunciation: [muʃɛ̃]) is a commune in the Nord department in northern France, close to the border with Belgium. About one kilometre northwest of the village centre lies the hamlet of Bercu.

== Heraldry ==
| Arms of Mouchin | The arms of Mouchin are blazoned : Gules, a cross moline between 4 laurel crowns Or. |

== See also ==
- Communes of the Nord department
