= Herrin, Nord =

Herrin
- Commune
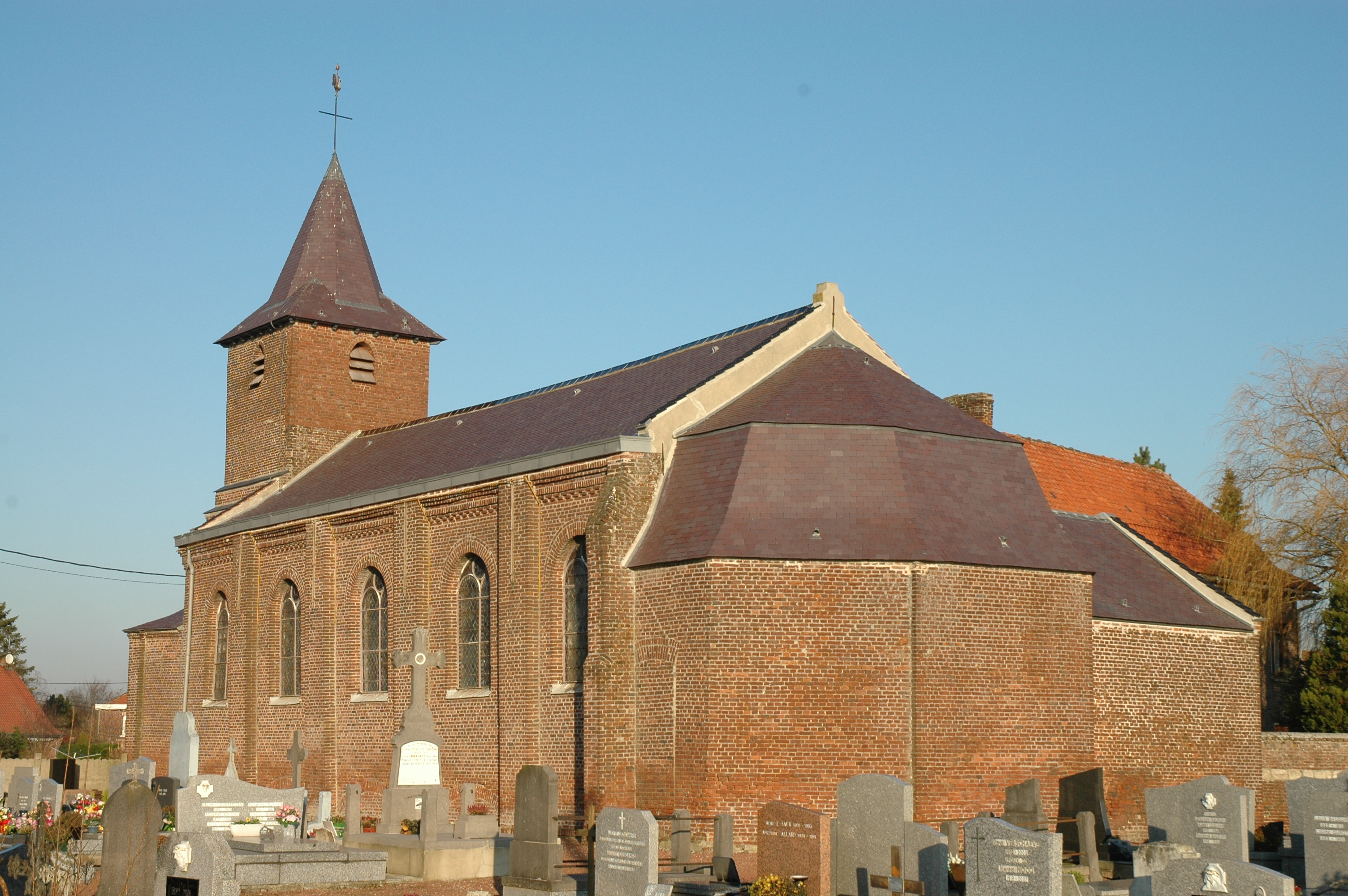
- The church in Herrin

- Coat of arms
- Location of Herrin
- Location within France Location within Hauts-de-France
- Coordinates: 50°32′50″N 2°57′58″E
- Country: France
- Region: Hauts-de-France
- Department: Nord
- Arrondissement: Lille
- Canton: Faches-Thumesnil
- Intercommunality: Pévèle-Carembault

Government
  - Mayor (2020–2026): Marcel Procureur
- Area^{1}: 2.17 km^{2} (0.84 sq mi)
- Elevation: 25 m (82 ft)
- Highest elevation: 27 m (89 ft)
- Lowest elevation: 18 m (59 ft)
- Population (2023): 425
  - Density: 196/km^{2} (507/sq mi)
- Time zone: UTC+01:00 (CET)
  - Summer (DST): UTC+02:00 (CEST)
- INSEE/Postal code: 59304 /59147
- ^{1} French Land Register data, which excludes lakes, ponds, glaciers > 1 km^{2} (0.386 sq mi or 247 acres) and river estuaries.

Herrin (French pronunciation: [ɛʁɛ̃]) is a commune in the Nord department in northern France.

== Heraldry ==
Arms of Herrin	The arms of Herrin are blazoned : Gules, a chief Or fretty sable.

== See also ==
- Communes of the Nord department
