= Attiches =

- Commune
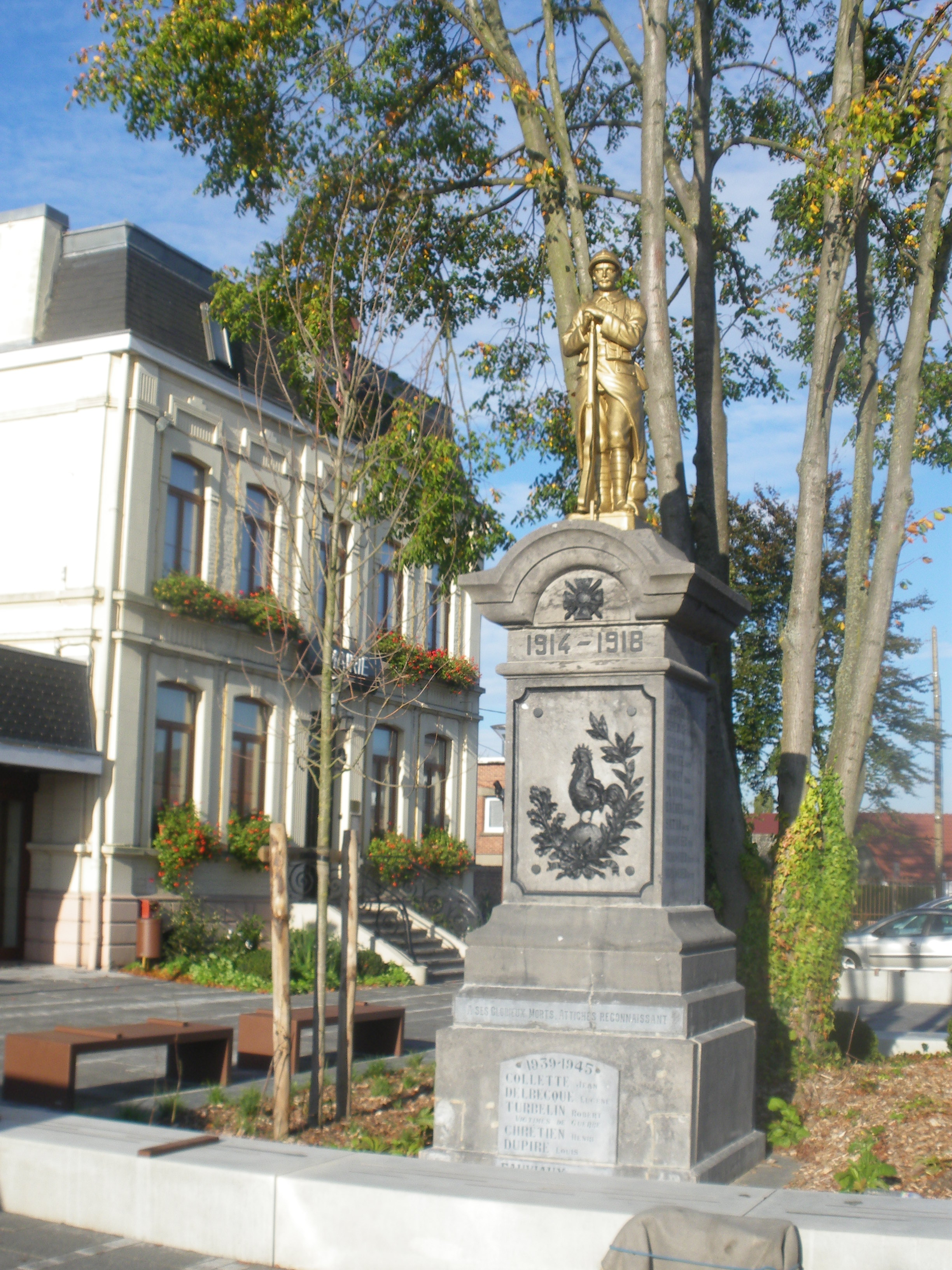
- The town hall and war memorial in Attiches

- Coat of arms
- Location of Attiches
- Location within France Location within Hauts-de-France
- Coordinates: 50°31′23″N 3°03′43″E
- Country: France
- Region: Hauts-de-France
- Department: Nord
- Arrondissement: Lille
- Canton: Templeuve-en-Pévèle
- Intercommunality: CC Pévèle-Carembault

Government
  - Mayor (2020–2026): Luc Foutry
- Area^{1}: 6.68 km^{2} (2.58 sq mi)
- Elevation: 60 m (200 ft)
- Highest elevation: 62 m (203 ft)
- Lowest elevation: 34 m (112 ft)
- Population (2023): 2,245
  - Density: 336/km^{2} (870/sq mi)
- Time zone: UTC+01:00 (CET)
  - Summer (DST): UTC+02:00 (CEST)
- INSEE/Postal code: 59022 /59551
- ^{1} French Land Register data, which excludes lakes, ponds, glaciers > 1 km^{2} (0.386 sq mi or 247 acres) and river estuaries.

Attiches (French pronunciation: [atiʃ]) is a commune in the Nord department in northern France.

== Population ==
Historical population

Year	Pop.	±% p.a.
1793	869	—
1821	894	+0.10%
1846	938	+0.19%
1872	895	−0.18%
1901	876	−0.07%
1926	744	−0.65%
1946	743	−0.01%
1962	747	+0.03%
1968	808	+1.32%

Year	Pop.	±% p.a.
1975	1,607	+10.32%
1982	1,931	+2.66%
1990	1,954	+0.15%
1999	2,229	+1.47%
2007	2,276	+0.26%
2012	2,270	−0.05%
2017	2,275	+0.04%
2023	2,245	−0.22%

Source: EHESS and INSEE (1968-2023)

== Heraldry ==
Arms of Attiches	The arms of Attiches are blazoned : Or, a bend chequy gules and argent of 2 traits.

== See also ==
- Communes of the Nord department
