= Wahagnies =

- Commune
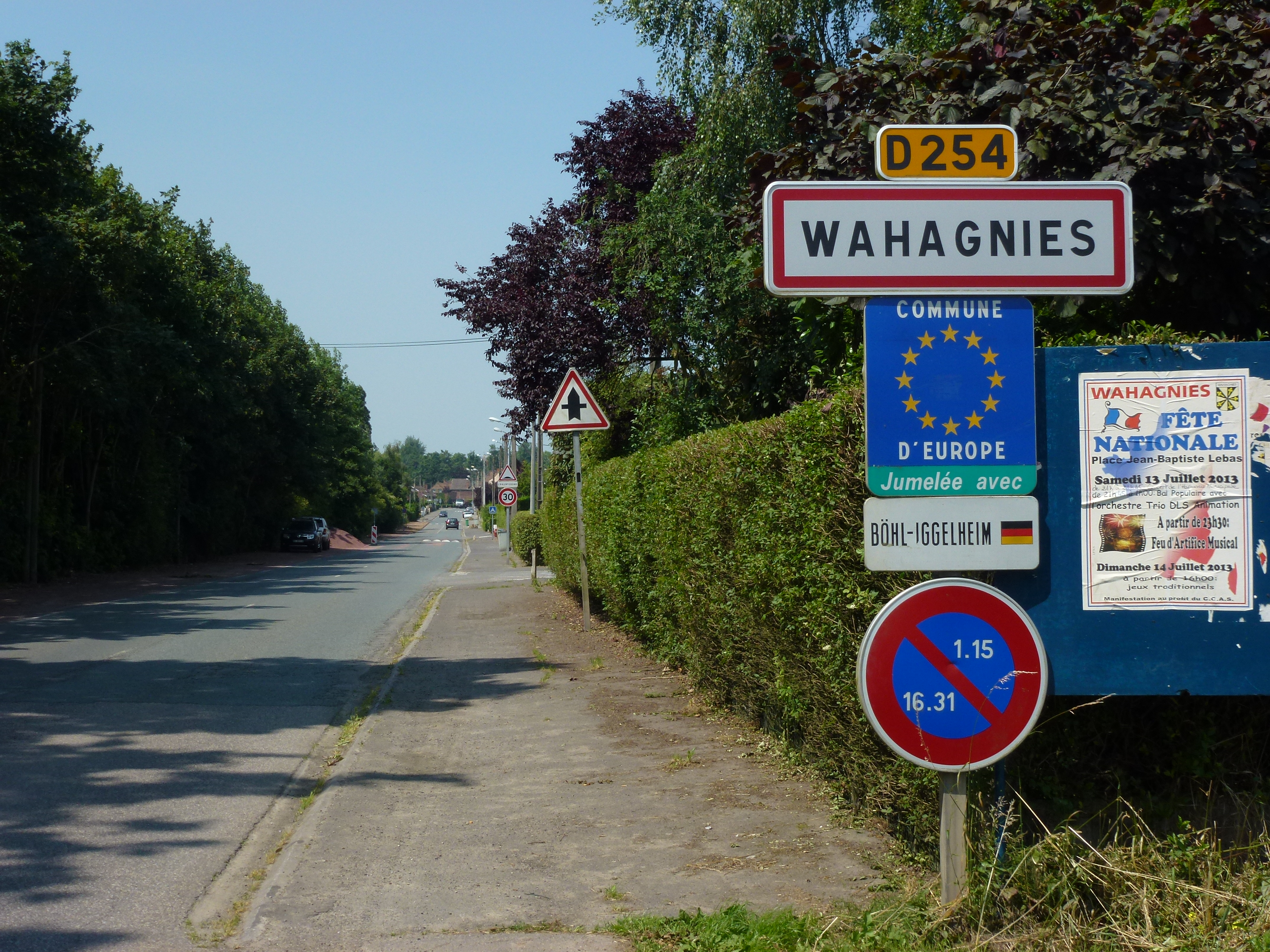
- The road into Wahagnies

- Coat of arms
- Location of Wahagnies
- Location within France Location within Hauts-de-France
- Coordinates: 50°29′11″N 3°02′12″E
- Country: France
- Region: Hauts-de-France
- Department: Nord
- Arrondissement: Lille
- Canton: Annœullin
- Intercommunality: Pévèle Carembault

Government
  - Mayor (2020–2026): Alain Bos
- Area^{1}: 5.69 km^{2} (2.20 sq mi)
- Elevation: 33 m (108 ft)
- Highest elevation: 66 m (217 ft)
- Lowest elevation: 27 m (89 ft)
- Population (2023): 2,613
  - Density: 459/km^{2} (1,190/sq mi)
- Time zone: UTC+01:00 (CET)
  - Summer (DST): UTC+02:00 (CEST)
- INSEE/Postal code: 59630 /59261
- ^{1} French Land Register data, which excludes lakes, ponds, glaciers > 1 km^{2} (0.386 sq mi or 247 acres) and river estuaries.

Wahagnies (French pronunciation: [va.aɲi]) is a commune in the Nord department in northern France.

== Geography ==
The commune is situated between Flandre and Artois and has a distance of 20 km to Lille and 35 km to Arras. It covers an area of approximately 569 ha (2.20 sq mi).

== Population ==
Historical population
Year	Pop.	±% p.a.
1968	2,504	—
1975	3,190	+3.52%
1982	2,911	−1.30%
1990	2,674	−1.06%
1999	2,689	+0.06%
2007	2,599	−0.42%
2012	2,616	+0.13%
2017	2,598	−0.14%
2023	2,613	+0.10%
Source: INSEE

== Heraldry ==
Arms of Wahagnies	The arms of Wahagnies are blazoned : Azure, a chevron argent between 2 anchors and a cow passant Or, a chief per pale 1 Gules, a mitre Or, and 2 paly Or and gules.

== Twin towns ==
Wahagnies is twinned with Böhl-Iggelheim (Rhineland-Palatinate, Germany)

== See also ==
- Communes of the Nord department
