= Tressin =

- Commune
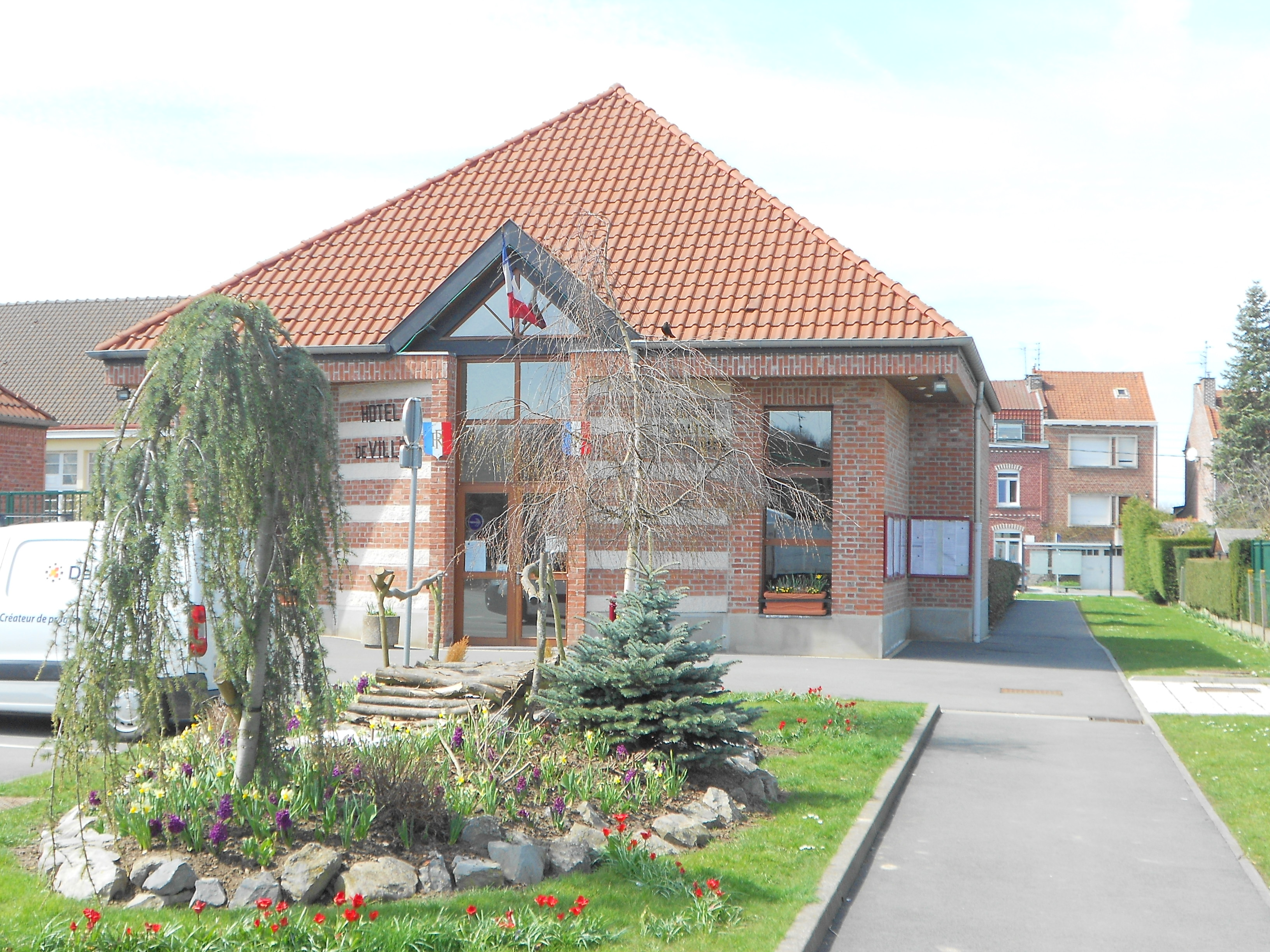
- The town hall in Tressin

- Coat of arms
- Location of Tressin
- Location within France Location within Hauts-de-France
- Coordinates: 50°37′14″N 3°11′42″E
- Country: France
- Region: Hauts-de-France
- Department: Nord
- Arrondissement: Lille
- Canton: Templeuve-en-Pévèle
- Intercommunality: Métropole Européenne de Lille

Government
  - Mayor (2020–2026): Jean-Luc Verlyck
- Area^{1}: 1.89 km^{2} (0.73 sq mi)
- Elevation: 25 m (82 ft)
- Highest elevation: 34 m (112 ft)
- Lowest elevation: 23 m (75 ft)
- Population (2023): 1,386
  - Density: 733/km^{2} (1,900/sq mi)
- Time zone: UTC+01:00 (CET)
  - Summer (DST): UTC+02:00 (CEST)
- INSEE/Postal code: 59602 /59152
- ^{1} French Land Register data, which excludes lakes, ponds, glaciers > 1 km^{2} (0.386 sq mi or 247 acres) and river estuaries.

Tressin (French pronunciation: [tʁɛsɛ̃]) is a commune of the Nord department in northern France. It is part of the Métropole Européenne de Lille.

== Heraldry ==
Arms of Tressin	The arms of Tressin are blazoned : Azure semy de lys, on an inescutcheon Or a lion sable, armed and langued gules.

== See also ==
- Communes of the Nord department
