= Tourmignies =

- Commune
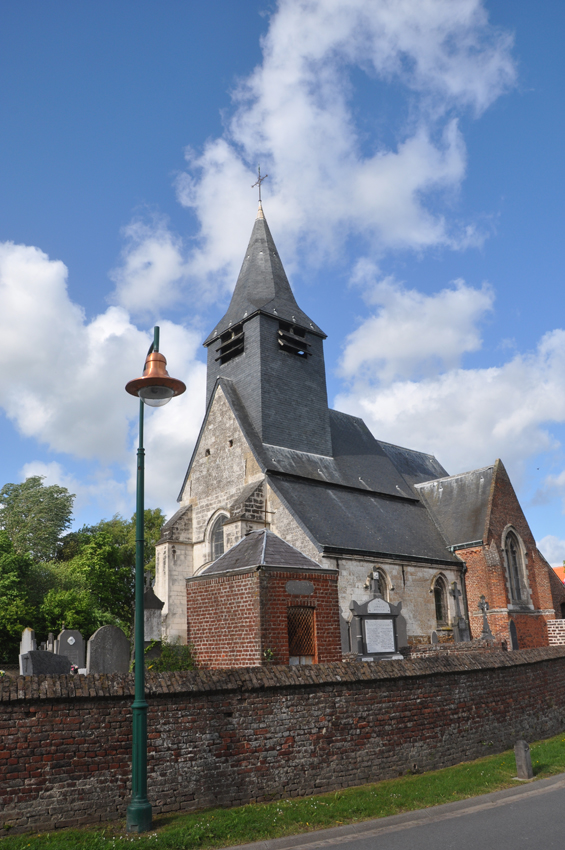
- St Peter's church, Tourmignies

- Coat of arms
- Location of Tourmignies
- Location within France Location within Hauts-de-France
- Coordinates: 50°30′27″N 3°05′06″E
- Country: France
- Region: Hauts-de-France
- Department: Nord
- Arrondissement: Lille
- Canton: Templeuve-en-Pévèle
- Intercommunality: Pévèle-Carembault

Government
  - Mayor (2020–2026): Alain Duchesne
- Area^{1}: 2.03 km^{2} (0.78 sq mi)
- Elevation: 57 m (187 ft)
- Highest elevation: 49 m (161 ft)
- Lowest elevation: 37 m (121 ft)
- Population (2023): 936
  - Density: 461/km^{2} (1,190/sq mi)
- Time zone: UTC+01:00 (CET)
  - Summer (DST): UTC+02:00 (CEST)
- INSEE/Postal code: 59600 /59551
- ^{1} French Land Register data, which excludes lakes, ponds, glaciers > 1 km^{2} (0.386 sq mi or 247 acres) and river estuaries.

Tourmignies (French pronunciation: [tuʁmiɲi]) is a commune in the Nord department and Hauts-de-France region of northern France.

== Population ==
Historical population
Year	Pop.	±% p.a.
1968	505	—
1975	576	+1.90%
1982	596	+0.49%
1990	615	+0.39%
1999	756	+2.32%
2007	694	−1.06%
2012	738	+1.24%
2017	888	+3.77%
2023	936	+0.88%
Source: INSEE

== Heraldry ==
Arms of Tourmignies	The arms of Tourmignies are blazoned : Gules, a fess ermine.

== See also ==
- Communes of the Nord department
