= Moncheaux =

- Commune
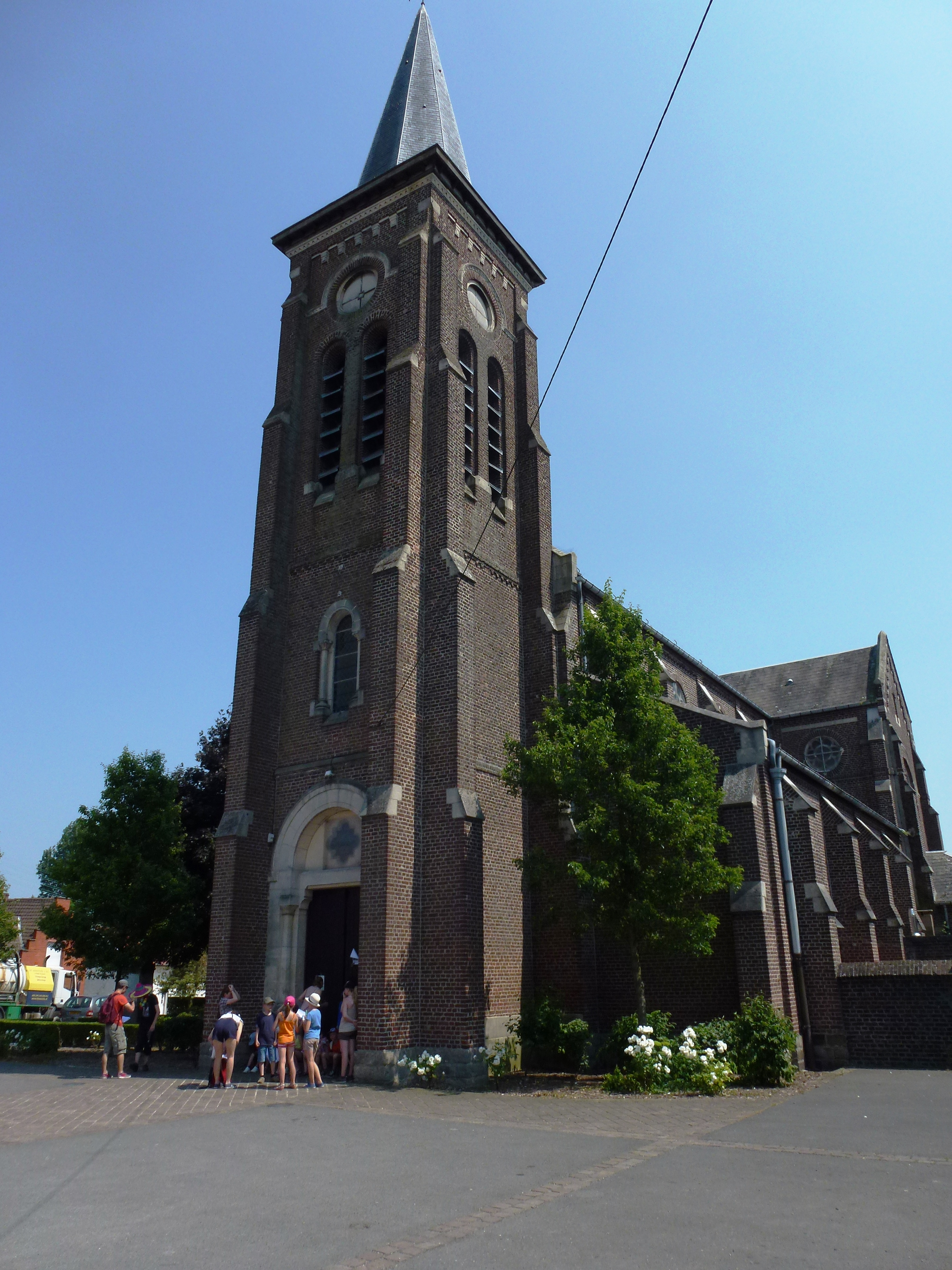
- The church in Moncheaux

- Coat of arms
- Location of Moncheaux
- Location within France Location within Hauts-de-France
- Coordinates: 50°27′12″N 3°04′49″E
- Country: France
- Region: Hauts-de-France
- Department: Nord
- Arrondissement: Lille
- Canton: Templeuve-en-Pévèle
- Intercommunality: CC Pévèle-Carembault

Government
  - Mayor (2020–2026): François-Hubert Descamps
- Area^{1}: 4.97 km^{2} (1.92 sq mi)
- Elevation: 75 m (246 ft)
- Highest elevation: 76 m (249 ft)
- Lowest elevation: 37 m (121 ft)
- Population (2023): 1,663
  - Density: 335/km^{2} (867/sq mi)
- Time zone: UTC+01:00 (CET)
  - Summer (DST): UTC+02:00 (CEST)
- INSEE/Postal code: 59408 /59283
- ^{1} French Land Register data, which excludes lakes, ponds, glaciers > 1 km^{2} (0.386 sq mi or 247 acres) and river estuaries.

Moncheaux (French pronunciation: [mɔ̃ʃo]) is a commune in the Nord department in northern France.

== Heraldry ==
Arms of Moncheaux	The arms of Moncheaux are blazoned : Vert, the name 'Monceaux' bendwise between 2 bendlets Or, and in (sinister) chief an inescutcheon gironny of 12 Or and azure charged with another inecutcheon gules. Note: it does say Monceaux not Moncheaux.

== See also ==
- Communes of the Nord department
