= Canton of Templeuve-en-Pévèle =

Administrative division of the Nord department, northern France

Coordinates: 50.53°N 3.17°E

The canton of Templeuve-en-Pévèle (before 2021: Templeuve) is an administrative division of the Nord department, northern France. It was created at the French canton reorganisation which came into effect in March 2015. Its seat is in Templeuve-en-Pévèle.

It consists of the following communes:

1. Anstaing
2. Attiches
3. Avelin
4. Bachy
5. Baisieux
6. Bersée
7. Bourghelles
8. Bouvines
9. Camphin-en-Pévèle
10. Cappelle-en-Pévèle
11. Chéreng
12. Cobrieux
13. Cysoing
14. Ennevelin
15. Fretin
16. Genech
17. Gruson
18. Lesquin
19. Louvil
20. Mérignies
21. Moncheaux
22. Mons-en-Pévèle
23. Mouchin
24. La Neuville
25. Péronne-en-Mélantois
26. Pont-à-Marcq
27. Sainghin-en-Mélantois
28. Templeuve-en-Pévèle
29. Thumeries
30. Tourmignies
31. Tressin
32. Wannehain
