= Arrondissement of Lille =

Coordinates: 50°37′N 3°4′E

Lille
- Arrondissement
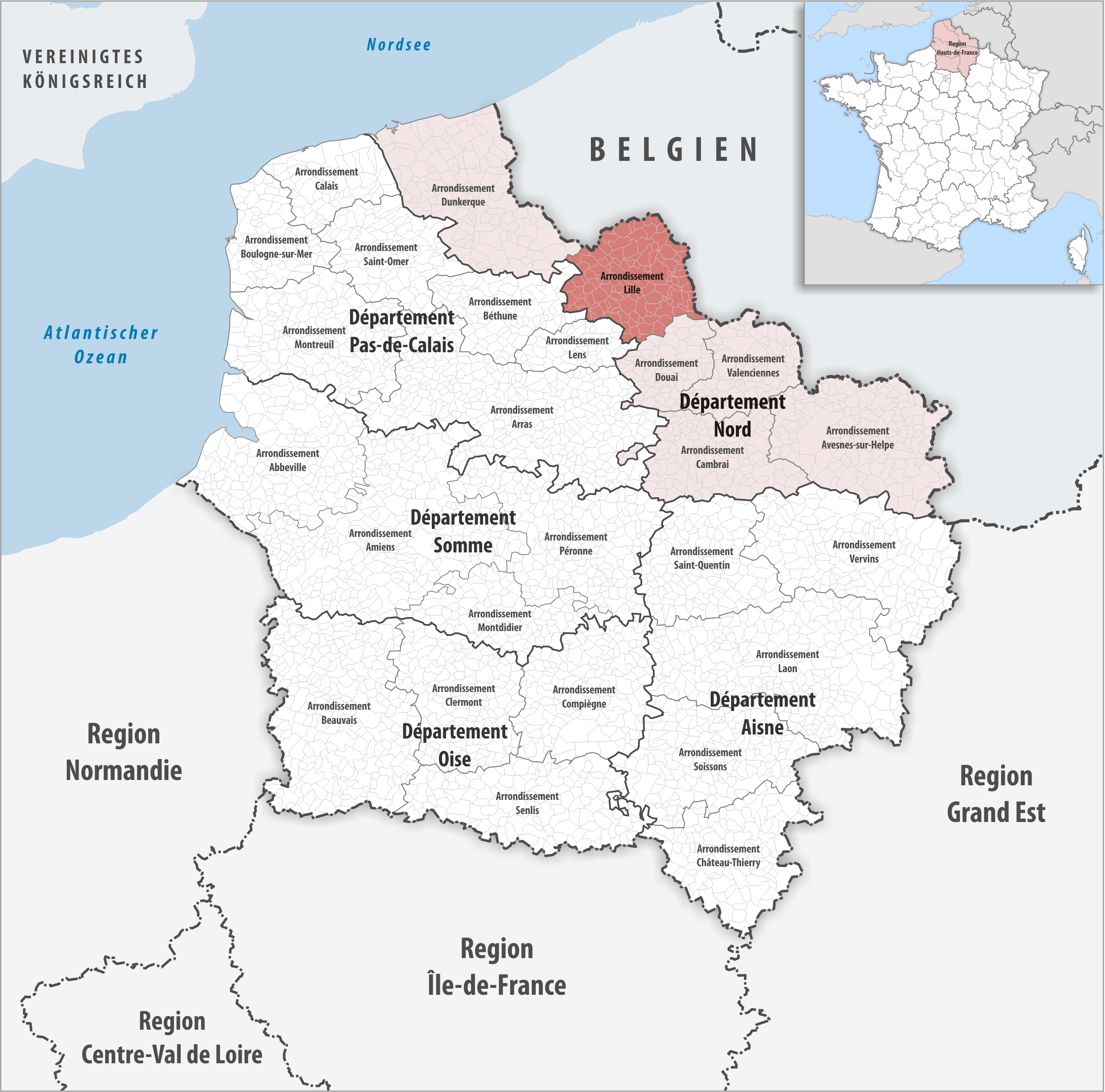
- Location within the region Hauts-de-France
- Country: France
- Region: Hauts-de-France
- Department: Nord
- No. of communes: {{{nbcomm}}}
- Area: 879.5 km^{2} (339.6 sq mi)
- Population (2023): 1,268,900
  - Density: 1,443/km^{2} (3,737/sq mi)
- INSEE code: 595

The arrondissement of Lille is an arrondissement of France in the Nord department in the Hauts-de-France region. It has 124 communes. Its population is 1,260,060 (2021), and its area is 879.5 km^{2} (339.6 sq mi).

== Composition ==
The communes of the arrondissement of Lille, and their INSEE codes, are:

1. Allennes-les-Marais (59005)
2. Annœullin (59011)
3. Anstaing (59013)
4. Armentières (59017)
5. Attiches (59022)
6. Aubers (59025)
7. Avelin (59034)
8. Bachy (59042)
9. Baisieux (59044)
10. La Bassée (59051)
11. Bauvin (59052)
12. Beaucamps-Ligny (59056)
13. Bersée (59071)
14. Bois-Grenier (59088)
15. Bondues (59090)
16. Bourghelles (59096)
17. Bousbecque (59098)
18. Bouvines (59106)
19. Camphin-en-Carembault (59123)
20. Camphin-en-Pévèle (59124)
21. Capinghem (59128)
22. Cappelle-en-Pévèle (59129)
23. Carnin (59133)
24. La Chapelle-d'Armentières (59143)
25. Chemy (59145)
26. Chéreng (59146)
27. Cobrieux (59150)
28. Comines (59152)
29. Croix (59163)
30. Cysoing (59168)
31. Deûlémont (59173)
32. Don (59670)
33. Emmerin (59193)
34. Englos (59195)
35. Ennetières-en-Weppes (59196)
36. Ennevelin (59197)
37. Erquinghem-le-Sec (59201)
38. Erquinghem-Lys (59202)
39. Escobecques (59208)
40. Faches-Thumesnil (59220)
41. Forest-sur-Marque (59247)
42. Fournes-en-Weppes (59250)
43. Frelinghien (59252)
44. Fretin (59256)
45. Fromelles (59257)
46. Genech (59258)
47. Gondecourt (59266)
48. Gruson (59275)
49. Hallennes-lez-Haubourdin (59278)
50. Halluin (59279)
51. Hantay (59281)
52. Haubourdin (59286)
53. Hem (59299)
54. Herlies (59303)
55. Herrin (59304)
56. Houplin-Ancoisne (59316)
57. Houplines (59317)
58. Illies (59320)
59. Lambersart (59328)
60. Lannoy (59332)
61. Leers (59339)
62. Lesquin (59343)
63. Lezennes (59346)
64. Lille (59350)
65. Linselles (59352)
66. Lompret (59356)
67. Loos (59360)
68. Louvil (59364)
69. Lys-lez-Lannoy (59367)
70. La Madeleine (59368)
71. Le Maisnil (59371)
72. Marcq-en-Barœul (59378)
73. Marquette-lez-Lille (59386)
74. Marquillies (59388)
75. Mérignies (59398)
76. Moncheaux (59408)
77. Mons-en-Barœul (59410)
78. Mons-en-Pévèle (59411)
79. Mouchin (59419)
80. Mouvaux (59421)
81. La Neuville (59427)
82. Neuville-en-Ferrain (59426)
83. Noyelles-lès-Seclin (59437)
84. Ostricourt (59452)
85. Pérenchies (59457)
86. Péronne-en-Mélantois (59458)
87. Phalempin (59462)
88. Pont-à-Marcq (59466)
89. Prémesques (59470)
90. Provin (59477)
91. Quesnoy-sur-Deûle (59482)
92. Radinghem-en-Weppes (59487)
93. Ronchin (59507)
94. Roncq (59508)
95. Roubaix (59512)
96. Sailly-lez-Lannoy (59522)
97. Sainghin-en-Mélantois (59523)
98. Sainghin-en-Weppes (59524)
99. Saint-André-lez-Lille (59527)
100. Salomé (59550)
101. Santes (59553)
102. Seclin (59560)
103. Sequedin (59566)
104. Templemars (59585)
105. Templeuve-en-Pévèle (59586)
106. Thumeries (59592)
107. Toufflers (59598)
108. Tourcoing (59599)
109. Tourmignies (59600)
110. Tressin (59602)
111. Vendeville (59609)
112. Verlinghem (59611)
113. Villeneuve-d'Ascq (59009)
114. Wahagnies (59630)
115. Wambrechies (59636)
116. Wannehain (59638)
117. Warneton (59643)
118. Wasquehal (59646)
119. Wattignies (59648)
120. Wattrelos (59650)
121. Wavrin (59653)
122. Wervicq-Sud (59656)
123. Wicres (59658)
124. Willems (59660)

== History ==
The arrondissement of Lille was created in 1800.

As a result of the reorganisation of the cantons of France which came into effect in 2015, the borders of the cantons are no longer related to the borders of the arrondissements. The cantons of the arrondissement of Lille were, as of January 2015:

1. Armentières
2. La Bassée
3. Cysoing
4. Haubourdin
5. Lannoy
6. Lille-Centre
7. Lille-Est
8. Lille-Nord
9. Lille-Nord-Est
10. Lille-Ouest
11. Lille-Sud
12. Lille-Sud-Est
13. Lille-Sud-Ouest
14. Lomme
15. Marcq-en-Barœul
16. Pont-à-Marcq
17. Quesnoy-sur-Deûle
18. Roubaix-Centre
19. Roubaix-Est
20. Roubaix-Nord
21. Roubaix-Ouest
22. Seclin-Nord
23. Seclin-Sud
24. Tourcoing-Nord
25. Tourcoing-Nord-Est
26. Tourcoing-Sud
27. Villeneuve-d'Ascq-Nord
28. Villeneuve-d'Ascq-Sud
