= Communauté de communes Pévèle-Carembault =

Federation of municipalities in France

Pévèle-Carembault
- Communauté de communes
- Interactive map of Pévèle-Carembault
- Coordinates: 50°30′N 03°10′E
- Country: France
- Region: Hauts-de-France
- Department: Nord
- No. of communes: {{{nbcomm}}}
- Established: 1 January 2014

Government
  - President: Luc Foutry (DVD)
- Area: 310.3 km^{2} (119.8 sq mi)
- Population (2018): 95,816
  - Density: 308.8/km^{2} (799.7/sq mi)

The Communauté de communes Pévèle-Carembault is a communauté de communes in the Nord département and in the Hauts-de-France région of France. It was formed on 1 January 2014 by the merger of several former communautés de communes. Its seat is in Pont-à-Marcq. Its area is 310.3 km^{2}, and its population was 95,816 in 2018.

== Communes ==
The Communauté de communes consists of the following 38 communes:

1. Aix-en-Pévèle
2. Attiches
3. Auchy-lez-Orchies
4. Avelin
5. Bachy
6. Bersée
7. Beuvry-la-Forêt
8. Bourghelles
9. Bouvignies
10. Camphin-en-Carembault
11. Camphin-en-Pévèle
12. Cappelle-en-Pévèle
13. Chemy
14. Cobrieux
15. Coutiches
16. Cysoing
17. Ennevelin
18. Genech
19. Gondecourt
20. Herrin
21. Landas
22. Louvil
23. Mérignies
24. Moncheaux
25. Mons-en-Pévèle
26. Mouchin
27. La Neuville
28. Nomain
29. Orchies
30. Ostricourt
31. Phalempin
32. Pont-à-Marcq
33. Saméon
34. Templeuve-en-Pévèle
35. Thumeries
36. Tourmignies
37. Wahagnies
38. Wannehain
