= Bachy =

- Commune
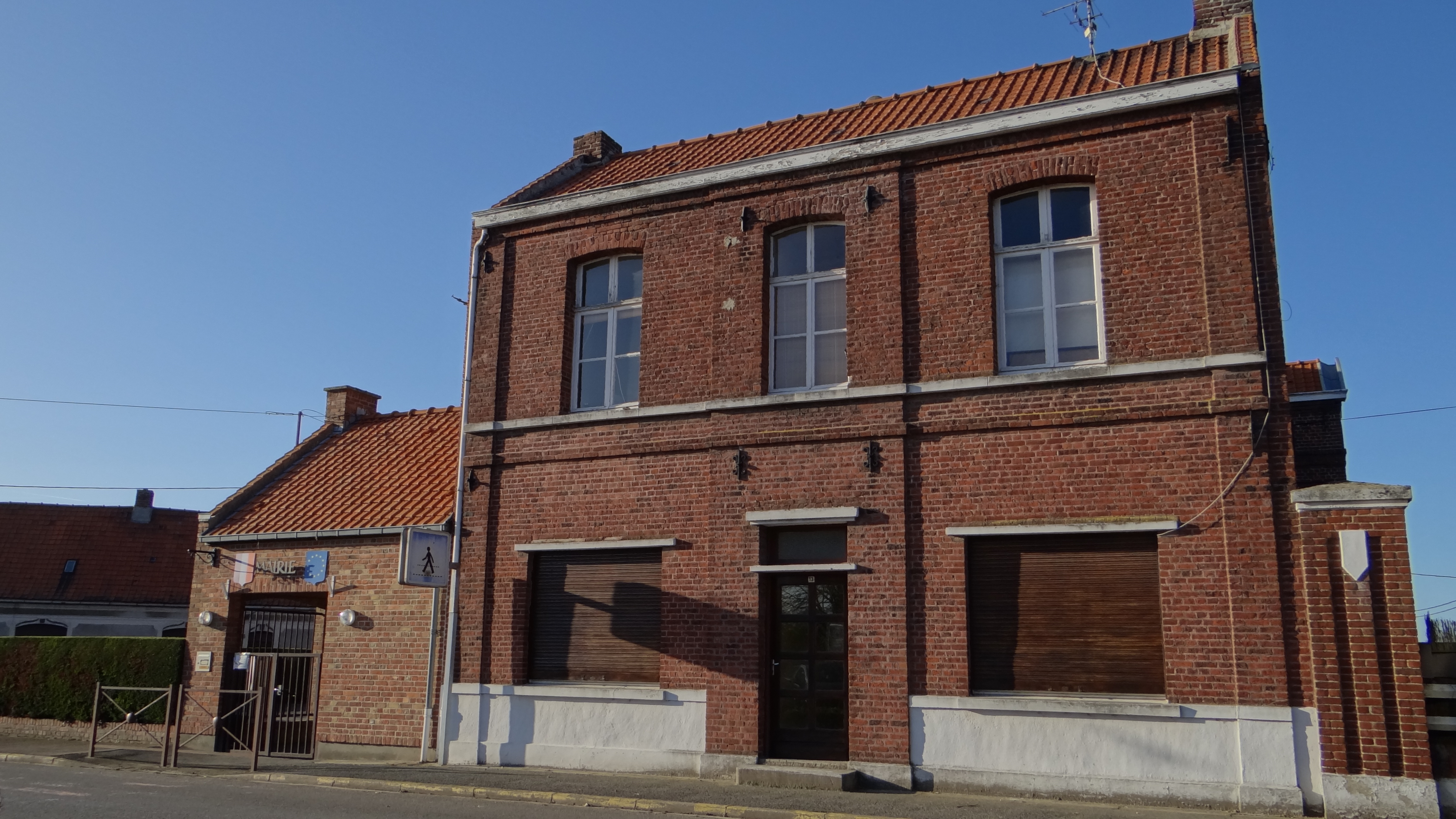
- Town hall

- Coat of arms
- Location of Bachy
- Location within France Location within Hauts-de-France
- Coordinates: 50°33′04″N 3°15′39″E
- Country: France
- Region: Hauts-de-France
- Department: Nord
- Arrondissement: Lille
- Canton: Templeuve-en-Pévèle
- Intercommunality: Pévèle Carembault

Government
  - Mayor (2020–2026): Philippe Delcourt
- Area^{1}: 6.41 km^{2} (2.47 sq mi)
- Elevation: 73 m (240 ft)
- Highest elevation: 74 m (243 ft)
- Lowest elevation: 31 m (102 ft)
- Population (2023): 1,898
  - Density: 296/km^{2} (767/sq mi)
- Time zone: UTC+01:00 (CET)
  - Summer (DST): UTC+02:00 (CEST)
- INSEE/Postal code: 59042 /59830
- ^{1} French Land Register data, which excludes lakes, ponds, glaciers > 1 km^{2} (0.386 sq mi or 247 acres) and river estuaries.

Bachy (French pronunciation: [baʃi]) is a commune in the Nord department in northern France.

== Population ==
Historical population
Year	Pop.	±% p.a.
1968	816	—
1975	888	+1.22%
1982	1,001	+1.73%
1990	1,134	+1.57%
1999	1,332	+1.80%
2007	1,411	+0.72%
2012	1,591	+2.43%
2017	1,702	+1.36%
2023	1,898	+1.83%
Source: INSEE

== Heraldry ==
Arms of Bachy	The arms of Bachy are blazoned : Gules, on a chief Or, in dexter a lion sable.

== See also ==
- Communes of the Nord department
