= Chéreng =

- Commune
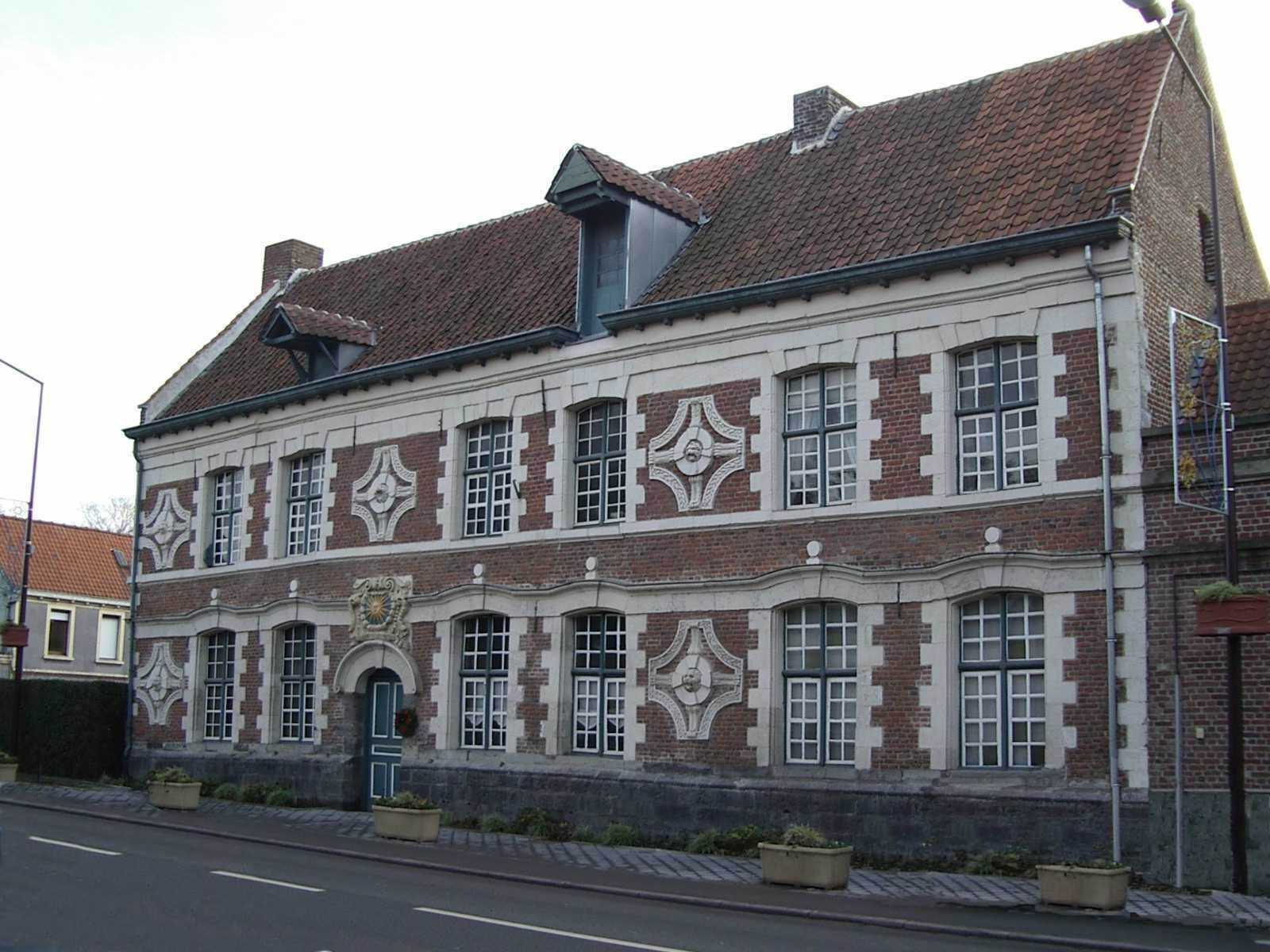
- The former post office in Chéreng

- Coat of arms
- Location of Chéreng
- Location within France Location within Hauts-de-France
- Coordinates: 50°36′41″N 3°12′19″E
- Country: France
- Region: Hauts-de-France
- Department: Nord
- Arrondissement: Lille
- Canton: Templeuve-en-Pévèle
- Intercommunality: Métropole Européenne de Lille

Government
  - Mayor (2020–2026): Pascal Zoute
- Area^{1}: 4.18 km^{2} (1.61 sq mi)
- Elevation: 24 m (79 ft)
- Highest elevation: 47 m (154 ft)
- Lowest elevation: 23 m (75 ft)
- Population (2023): 3,078
  - Density: 736/km^{2} (1,910/sq mi)
- Time zone: UTC+01:00 (CET)
  - Summer (DST): UTC+02:00 (CEST)
- INSEE/Postal code: 59146 /59152
- ^{1} French Land Register data, which excludes lakes, ponds, glaciers > 1 km^{2} (0.386 sq mi or 247 acres) and river estuaries.

Chéreng (French pronunciation: [ʃeʁɑ̃]) is a commune of the Nord department in northern France.

== Population ==
Historical population
Year	Pop.	±% p.a.
1968	1,811	—
1975	1,828	+0.13%
1982	1,991	+1.23%
1990	2,634	+3.56%
1999	2,930	+1.19%
2007	3,033	+0.43%
2012	2,989	−0.29%
2017	2,990	+0.01%
2023	3,078	+0.48%
Source: INSEE

== Heraldry ==
Arms of Chéreng	The arms of Chéreng are blazoned : Gules, on a chief Or, a lion (rampant) sable.

== Twinning ==
Chereng is twinned with East Peckham, Kent, United Kingdom.

== See also ==
- Communes of the Nord department
