= Anstaing =

- Commune
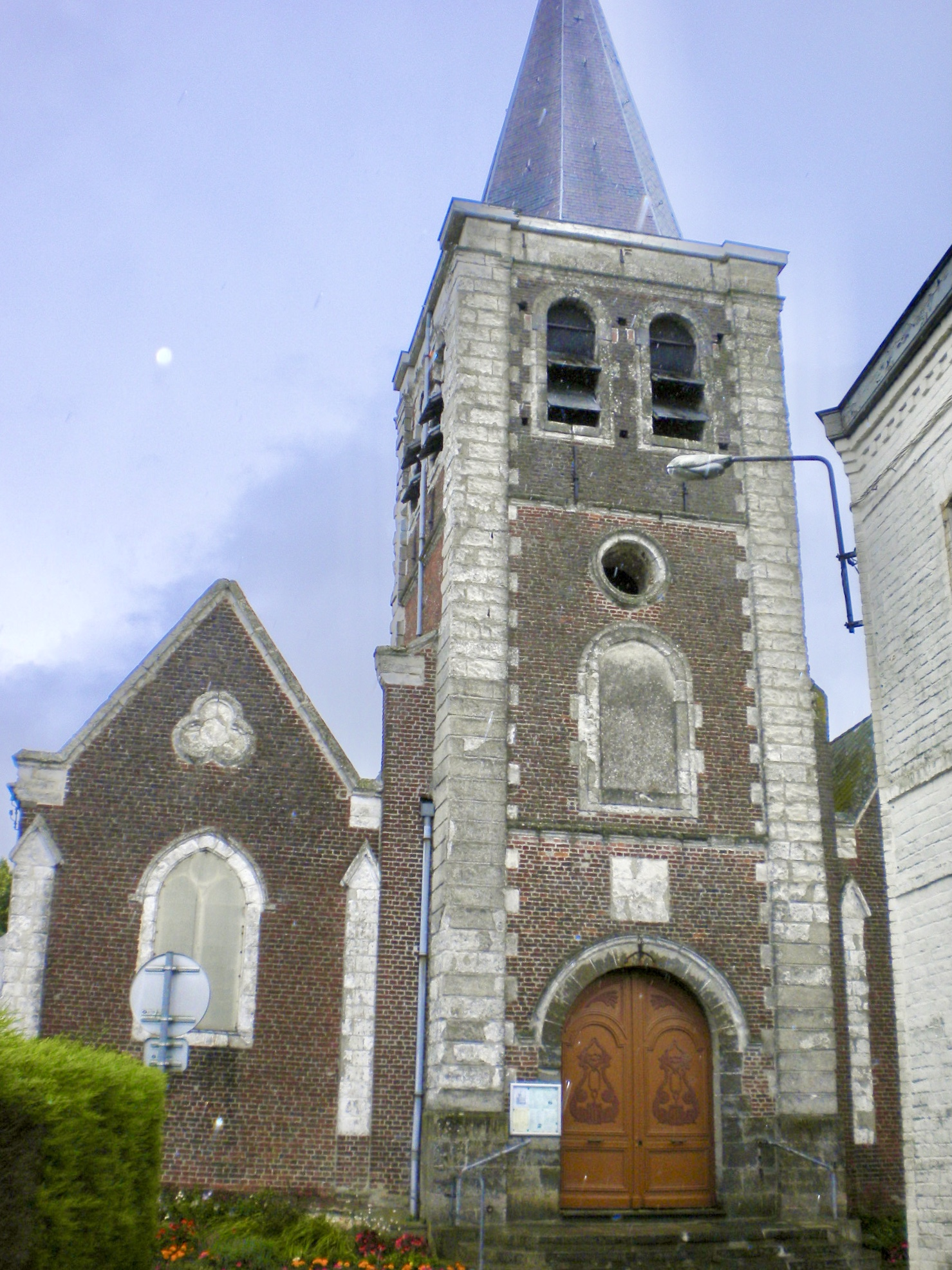
- The church in Anstaing

- Coat of arms
- Location of Anstaing
- Location within France Location within Hauts-de-France
- Coordinates: 50°36′21″N 3°11′30″E
- Country: France
- Region: Hauts-de-France
- Department: Nord
- Arrondissement: Lille
- Canton: Templeuve-en-Pévèle
- Intercommunality: Métropole Européenne de Lille

Government
  - Mayor (2020–2026): Étienne Dumoulin
- Area^{1}: 2.3 km^{2} (0.89 sq mi)
- Elevation: 27 m (89 ft)
- Highest elevation: 40 m (130 ft)
- Lowest elevation: 23 m (75 ft)
- Population (2023): 1,631
  - Density: 710/km^{2} (1,800/sq mi)
- Time zone: UTC+01:00 (CET)
  - Summer (DST): UTC+02:00 (CEST)
- INSEE/Postal code: 59013 /59152
- ^{1} French Land Register data, which excludes lakes, ponds, glaciers > 1 km^{2} (0.386 sq mi or 247 acres) and river estuaries.

Anstaing (French pronunciation: [ɑ̃stɛ̃]) is a commune in the Nord department in northern France.

The name is probably of Germanic origin, meaning "village of Anst".

== Population ==
Historical population
Year	Pop.	±% p.a.
1968	1,007	—
1975	972	−0.50%
1982	1,058	+1.22%
1990	1,115	+0.66%
1999	1,183	+0.66%
2007	1,189	+0.06%
2012	1,339	+2.40%
2017	1,469	+1.87%
2023	1,631	+1.76%
Source: INSEE

== Heraldry ==
Arms of Anstaing	The arms of Anstaing are blazoned : Or, a canton gules. (Anstaing and Sainghin-en-Mélantois use the same arms.)

== See also ==
- Communes of the Nord department
