= Cappelle-en-Pévèle =

- Commune
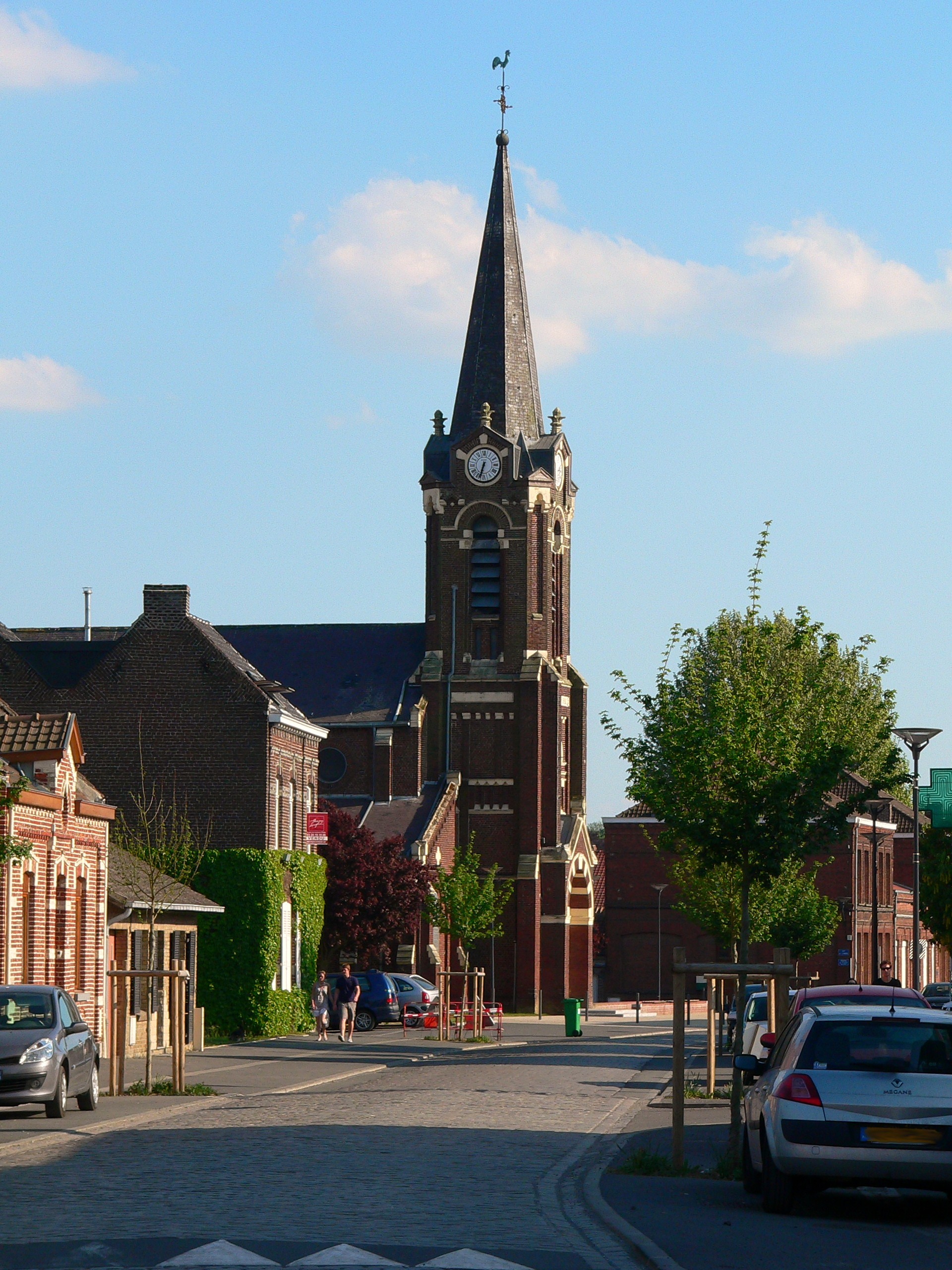
- A general view of Cappelle-en-Pévèle

- Coat of arms
- Location of Cappelle-en-Pévèle
- Location within France Location within Hauts-de-France
- Coordinates: 50°30′39″N 3°10′24″E
- Country: France
- Region: Hauts-de-France
- Department: Nord
- Arrondissement: Lille
- Canton: Templeuve-en-Pévèle
- Intercommunality: Pévèle-Carembault

Government
  - Mayor (2020–2026): Bernard Chocraux
- Area^{1}: 8.11 km^{2} (3.13 sq mi)
- Elevation: 44 m (144 ft)
- Highest elevation: 56 m (184 ft)
- Lowest elevation: 34 m (112 ft)
- Population (2023): 2,257
  - Density: 278/km^{2} (721/sq mi)
- Time zone: UTC+01:00 (CET)
  - Summer (DST): UTC+02:00 (CEST)
- INSEE/Postal code: 59129 /59242
- ^{1} French Land Register data, which excludes lakes, ponds, glaciers > 1 km^{2} (0.386 sq mi or 247 acres) and river estuaries.

Cappelle-en-Pévèle (French pronunciation: [kapɛl ɑ̃ pevɛl]) is a commune in the Nord department in northern France.

== Geography ==
=== Climate ===
Cappelle-en-Pévèle has an oceanic climate (Köppen climate classification Cfb). The average annual temperature in Cappelle-en-Pévèle is 11.1 °C (52.0 °F). The average annual rainfall is 736.6 mm (29.00 in) with December as the wettest month. The temperatures are highest on average in July, at around 18.8 °C (65.8 °F), and lowest in January, at around 3.8 °C (38.8 °F). The highest temperature ever recorded in Cappelle-en-Pévèle was 41.9 °C (107.4 °F) on 25 July 2019; the coldest temperature ever recorded was −19.5 °C (−3.1 °F) on 14 January 1982.

Climate data for Cappelle-en-Pévèle (1991−2020 normals, extremes 1962−2020)
Month	Jan	Feb	Mar	Apr	May	Jun	Jul	Aug	Sep	Oct	Nov	Dec	Year
Record high °C (°F)	15.4 (59.7)	18.8 (65.8)	23.0 (73.4)	28.2 (82.8)	31.3 (88.3)	35.8 (96.4)	41.9 (107.4)	37.4 (99.3)	34.8 (94.6)	29.2 (84.6)	20.7 (69.3)	15.6 (60.1)	41.9 (107.4)
Mean daily maximum °C (°F)	6.4 (43.5)	7.5 (45.5)	11.3 (52.3)	15.5 (59.9)	18.9 (66.0)	22.0 (71.6)	24.3 (75.7)	24.3 (75.7)	20.6 (69.1)	15.5 (59.9)	10.1 (50.2)	6.8 (44.2)	15.3 (59.5)
Daily mean °C (°F)	3.8 (38.8)	4.5 (40.1)	7.3 (45.1)	10.4 (50.7)	13.8 (56.8)	16.7 (62.1)	18.8 (65.8)	18.7 (65.7)	15.6 (60.1)	11.6 (52.9)	7.3 (45.1)	4.4 (39.9)	11.1 (52.0)
Mean daily minimum °C (°F)	1.3 (34.3)	1.5 (34.7)	3.3 (37.9)	5.3 (41.5)	8.6 (47.5)	11.4 (52.5)	13.4 (56.1)	13.2 (55.8)	10.7 (51.3)	7.7 (45.9)	4.4 (39.9)	2.0 (35.6)	6.9 (44.4)
Record low °C (°F)	−19.5 (−3.1)	−13.5 (7.7)	−10.5 (13.1)	−4.1 (24.6)	−1.3 (29.7)	−3.0 (26.6)	3.5 (38.3)	5.0 (41.0)	2.0 (35.6)	−4.4 (24.1)	−8.3 (17.1)	−13.0 (8.6)	−19.5 (−3.1)
Average precipitation mm (inches)	59.5 (2.34)	49.9 (1.96)	52.6 (2.07)	41.4 (1.63)	57.0 (2.24)	65.7 (2.59)	70.2 (2.76)	71.6 (2.82)	57.6 (2.27)	63.3 (2.49)	72.5 (2.85)	75.3 (2.96)	736.6 (29.00)
Average precipitation days (≥ 1.0 mm)	11.9	10.6	10.3	9.0	10.0	9.7	9.4	9.7	9.1	10.6	12.9	12.6	125.8
Source: Météo-France

== Population ==
Historical population
Year	Pop.	±% p.a.
1968	1,361	—
1975	1,600	+2.34%
1982	1,823	+1.88%
1990	1,725	−0.69%
1999	1,959	+1.42%
2007	1,890	−0.45%
2012	2,273	+3.76%
2017	2,232	−0.36%
2023	2,257	+0.19%
Source: INSEE

== Heraldry ==
Arms of Cappelle-en-Pévèle	The arms of Cappelle-en-Pévèle are blazoned : Quarterly Or and gules. (Cappelle-en-Pévèle and Roucourt use the same arms.)

== See also ==
- Communes of the Nord department
