= Chemy =

- Commune
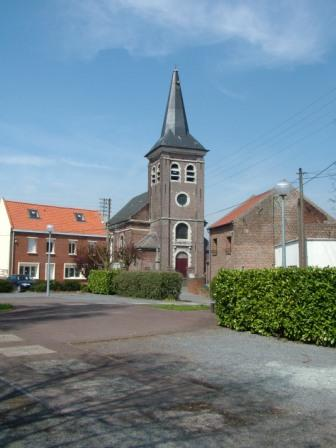
- The church in Chemy

- Coat of arms
- Location of Chemy
- Location within France Location within Hauts-de-France
- Coordinates: 50°31′52″N 2°59′21″E
- Country: France
- Region: Hauts-de-France
- Department: Nord
- Arrondissement: Lille
- Canton: Faches-Thumesnil
- Intercommunality: Pévèle-Carembault

Government
  - Mayor (2020–2026): Bernadette Sion
- Area^{1}: 3.48 km^{2} (1.34 sq mi)
- Elevation: 24 m (79 ft)
- Highest elevation: 31 m (102 ft)
- Lowest elevation: 22 m (72 ft)
- Population (2023): 766
  - Density: 220/km^{2} (570/sq mi)
- Time zone: UTC+01:00 (CET)
  - Summer (DST): UTC+02:00 (CEST)
- INSEE/Postal code: 59145 /59147
- ^{1} French Land Register data, which excludes lakes, ponds, glaciers > 1 km^{2} (0.386 sq mi or 247 acres) and river estuaries.

Chemy (French pronunciation: [ʃəmi]) is a commune of the Nord department in northern France.

== Heraldry ==
Arms of Chemy	The arms of Chemy are blazoned : Gules, Saint Piat in sacerdotal vestments, holding in his hands the cut off top of his own head, and at his feet a stag couchant Or.

== See also ==
- Communes of the Nord department
