= Genech =

- Commune
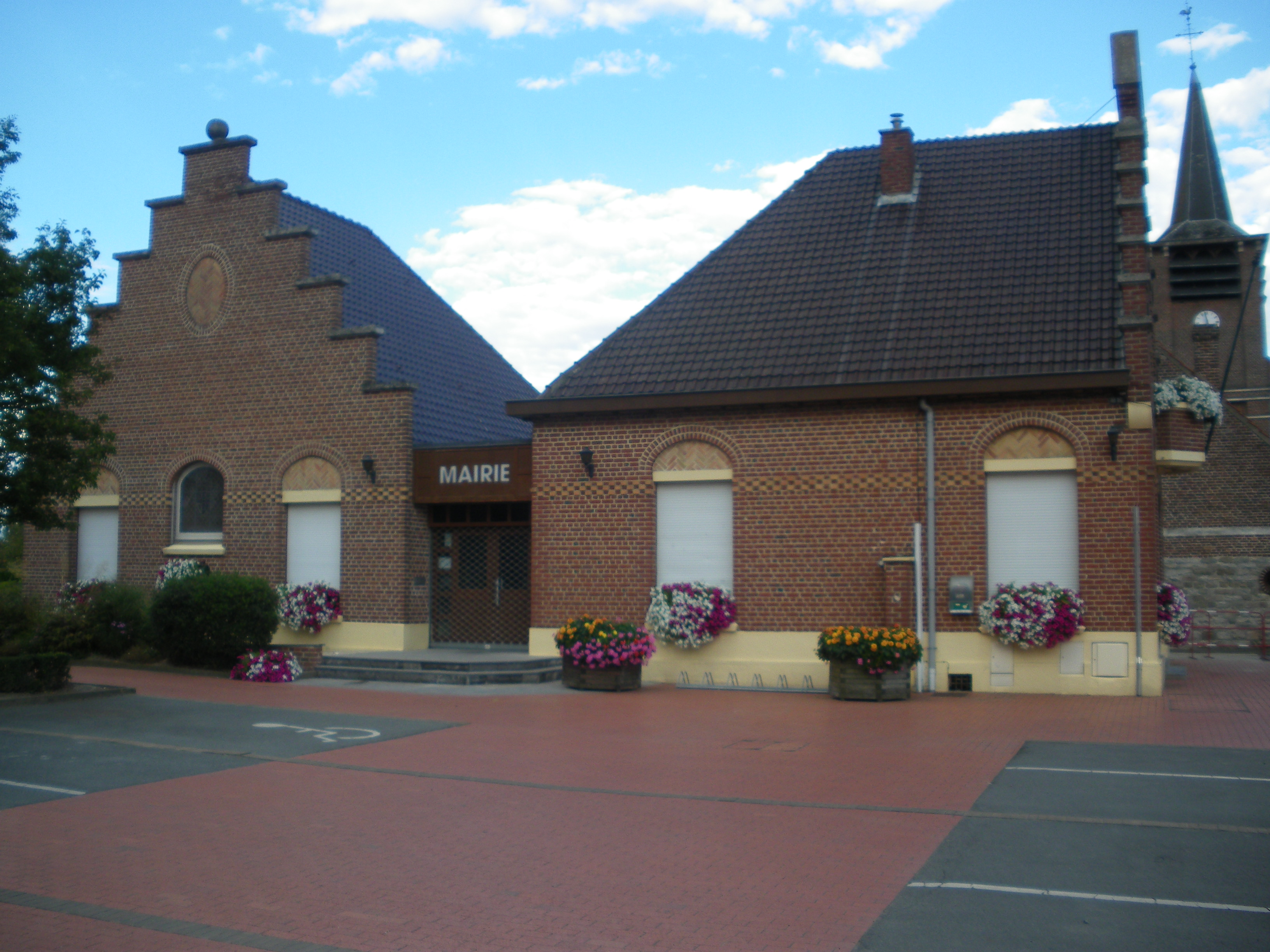
- The town hall in Genech

- Coat of arms
- Location of Genech
- Location within France Location within Hauts-de-France
- Coordinates: 50°31′53″N 3°13′02″E
- Country: France
- Region: Hauts-de-France
- Department: Nord
- Arrondissement: Lille
- Canton: Templeuve-en-Pévèle
- Intercommunality: CC Pévèle-Carembault

Government
  - Mayor (2023–2026): Anne Wauquier
- Area^{1}: 7.46 km^{2} (2.88 sq mi)
- Elevation: 43 m (141 ft)
- Highest elevation: 59 m (194 ft)
- Lowest elevation: 29 m (95 ft)
- Population (2023): 2,803
  - Density: 376/km^{2} (973/sq mi)
- Time zone: UTC+01:00 (CET)
  - Summer (DST): UTC+02:00 (CEST)
- INSEE/Postal code: 59258 /59242
- ^{1} French Land Register data, which excludes lakes, ponds, glaciers > 1 km^{2} (0.386 sq mi or 247 acres) and river estuaries.

Genech (French pronunciation: [ʒənɛ]; Dutch: Genst) is a commune in the Nord department in northern France.

== Population ==
Historical population
Year	Pop.	±% p.a.
1968	1,089	—
1975	1,187	+1.24%
1982	1,372	+2.09%
1990	1,642	+2.27%
1999	2,050	+2.50%
2007	2,608	+3.06%
2012	2,612	+0.03%
2017	2,702	+0.68%
2023	2,803	+0.61%
Source: INSEE

== Heraldry ==
Arms of Genech	The arms of Genech are blazoned : Ermine, on a cross gules, 5 cinqfoils Or.

== See also ==
- Communes of the Nord department
