= Cobrieux =

- Commune
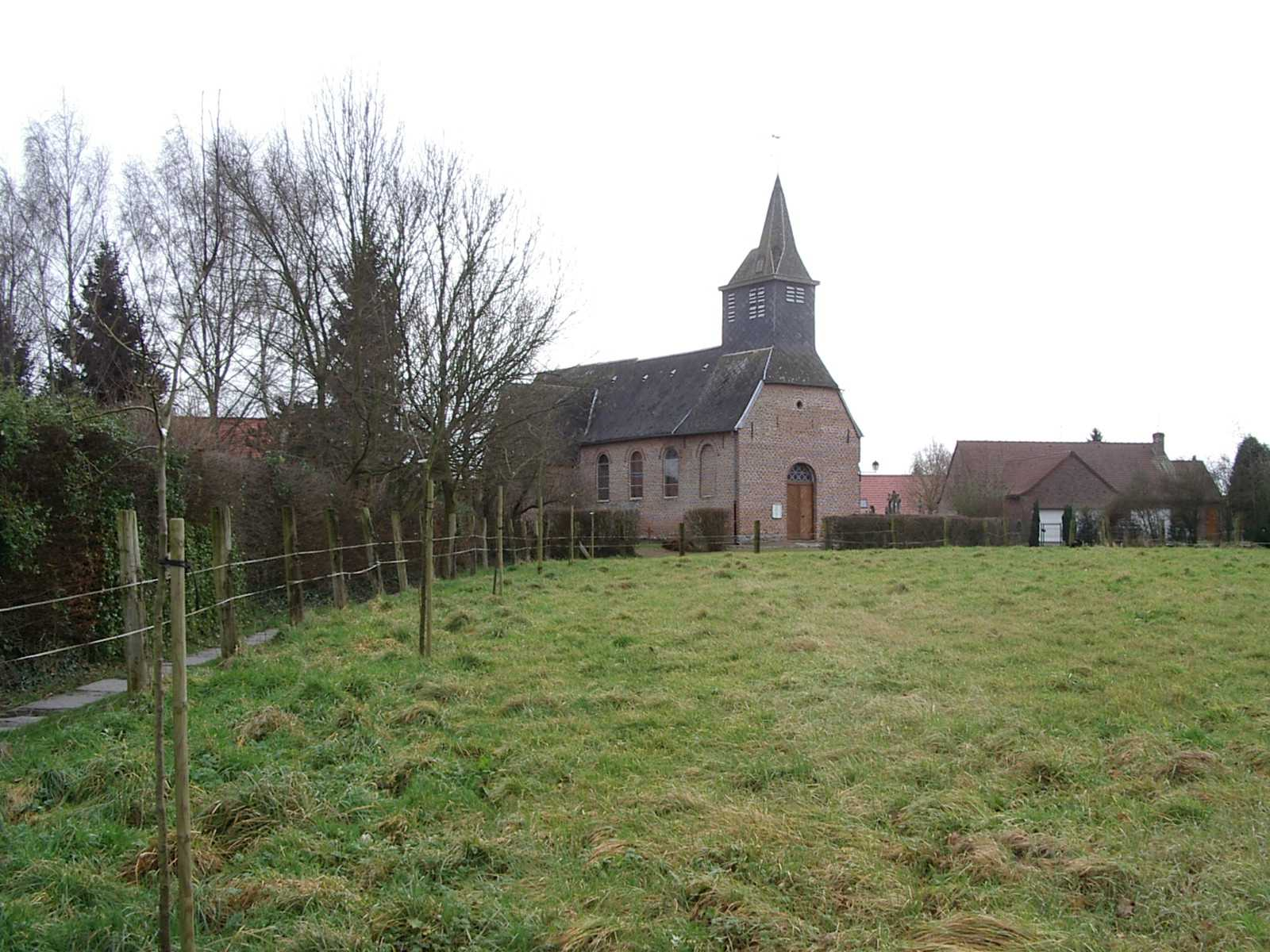
- A view within Cobrieux

- Coat of arms
- Location of Cobrieux
- Location within France Location within Hauts-de-France
- Coordinates: 50°32′40″N 3°13′49″E
- Country: France
- Region: Hauts-de-France
- Department: Nord
- Arrondissement: Lille
- Canton: Templeuve-en-Pévèle
- Intercommunality: CC Pévèle-Carembault

Government
  - Mayor (2020–2026): Patrick Lemaire
- Area^{1}: 2.84 km^{2} (1.10 sq mi)
- Elevation: 12 m (39 ft)
- Highest elevation: 66 m (217 ft)
- Lowest elevation: 30 m (98 ft)
- Population (2023): 563
  - Density: 198/km^{2} (513/sq mi)
- Time zone: UTC+01:00 (CET)
  - Summer (DST): UTC+02:00 (CEST)
- INSEE/Postal code: 59150 /59830
- ^{1} French Land Register data, which excludes lakes, ponds, glaciers > 1 km^{2} (0.386 sq mi or 247 acres) and river estuaries.

Cobrieux (French pronunciation: [kɔbʁijø]) is a commune of the Nord department in northern France.

== Heraldry ==
Arms of Cobrieux	The arms of Cobrieux are blazoned : Argent, a chevron gules between 3 crescents sable.

== See also ==
- Communes of the Nord department
