= Louvil =

- Commune
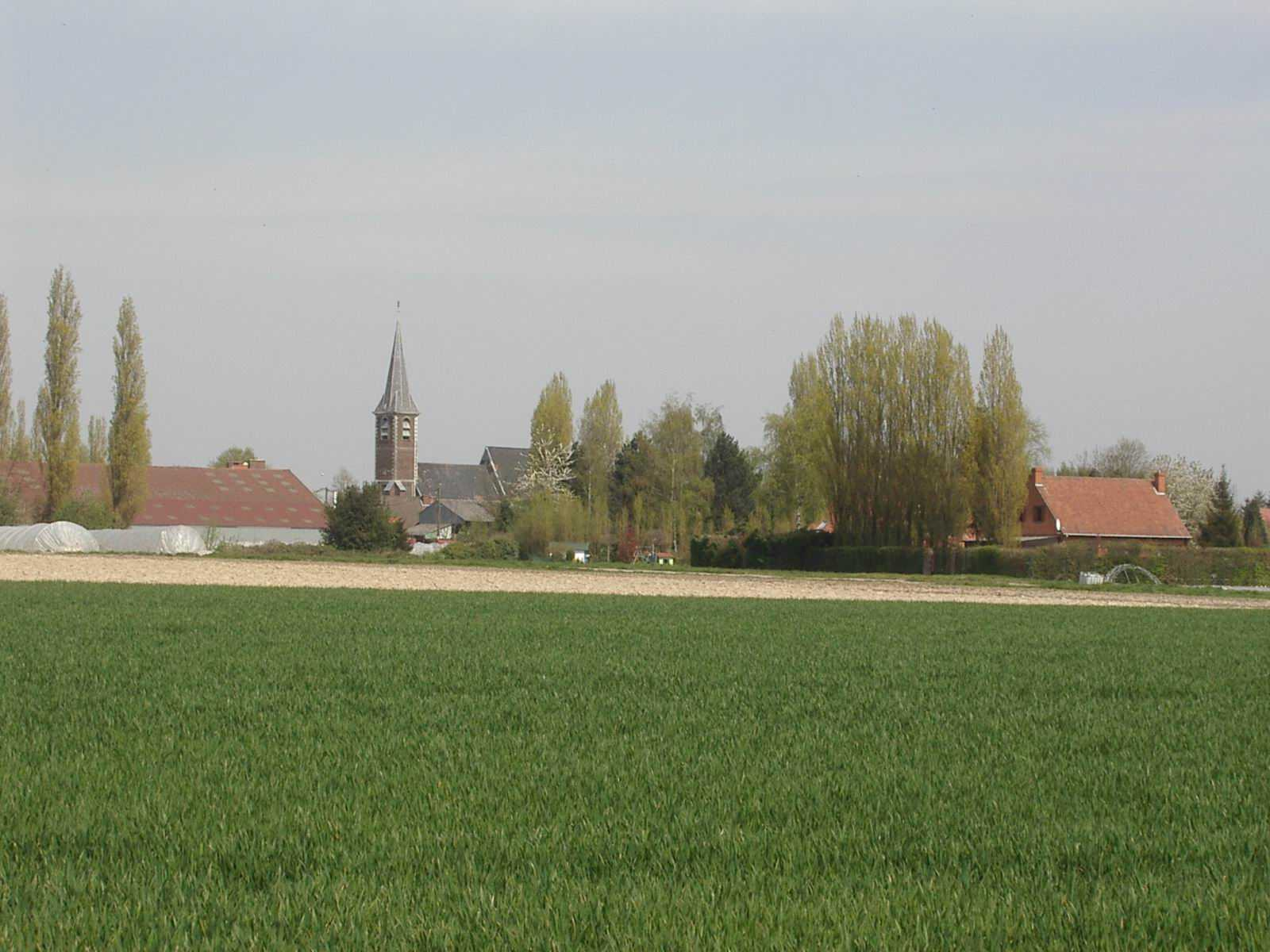
- A general view of Louvil

- Coat of arms
- Location of Louvil
- Location within France Location within Hauts-de-France
- Coordinates: 50°33′35″N 3°11′42″E
- Country: France
- Region: Hauts-de-France
- Department: Nord
- Arrondissement: Lille
- Canton: Templeuve-en-Pévèle
- Intercommunality: CC Pévèle-Carembault

Government
  - Mayor (2020–2026): Vinciane Faber
- Area^{1}: 2.5 km^{2} (0.97 sq mi)
- Elevation: 25 m (82 ft)
- Highest elevation: 32 m (105 ft)
- Lowest elevation: 26 m (85 ft)
- Population (2023): 922
  - Density: 370/km^{2} (960/sq mi)
- Time zone: UTC+01:00 (CET)
  - Summer (DST): UTC+02:00 (CEST)
- INSEE/Postal code: 59364 /59830
- ^{1} French Land Register data, which excludes lakes, ponds, glaciers > 1 km^{2} (0.386 sq mi or 247 acres) and river estuaries.

Louvil (French pronunciation: [luvil]) is a commune in the Nord department in northern France.

== Heraldry ==
Arms of Louvil	The arms of Louvil are blazoned : Gules, an escarbuncle Or pierced vert.

== See also ==
- Communes of the Nord department
