= Pont-à-Marcq =

- Commune
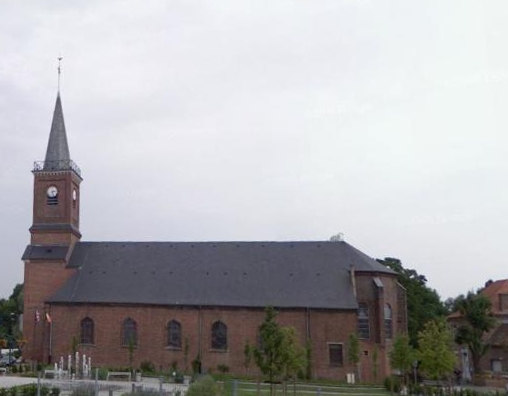
- The church at Pont-à-Marcq

- Coat of arms
- Location of Pont-à-Marcq
- Location within France Location within Hauts-de-France
- Coordinates: 50°31′21″N 3°07′01″E
- Country: France
- Region: Hauts-de-France
- Department: Nord
- Arrondissement: Lille
- Canton: Templeuve-en-Pévèle
- Intercommunality: CC Pévèle-Carembault

Government
  - Mayor (2020–2026): Sylvain Clement
- Area^{1}: 2.22 km^{2} (0.86 sq mi)
- Elevation: 37 m (121 ft)
- Highest elevation: 42 m (138 ft)
- Lowest elevation: 29 m (95 ft)
- Population (2023): 3,016
  - Density: 1,360/km^{2} (3,520/sq mi)
- Time zone: UTC+01:00 (CET)
  - Summer (DST): UTC+02:00 (CEST)
- INSEE/Postal code: 59466 /59710
- ^{1} French Land Register data, which excludes lakes, ponds, glaciers > 1 km^{2} (0.386 sq mi or 247 acres) and river estuaries.

Pont-à-Marcq (French pronunciation: [pɔ̃.t‿a maʁk]) is a commune in the Nord department in northern France.

It is the seat of the Communauté de communes Pévèle-Carembault.

== Population ==
Historical population
Year	Pop.	±% p.a.
1968	1,486	—
1975	1,652	+1.52%
1982	1,940	+2.32%
1990	1,912	−0.18%
1999	2,115	+1.13%
2007	2,396	+1.57%
2012	2,733	+2.67%
2017	2,884	+1.08%
2023	3,016	+0.75%
Source: INSEE

== Heraldry ==
Arms of Pont-à-Marcq	The arms of Pont-à-Marcq are blazoned : Sable, an eagle argent, beaked and membered Or. (La Madeleine and Pont-à-Marcq use the same arms.)

== See also ==
- Communes of the Nord department
