= Orchies =

- Commune
- The town hall

- Coat of arms
- Location of Orchies
- Location within France Location within Hauts-de-France
- Coordinates: 50°28′32″N 3°14′42″E
- Country: France
- Region: Hauts-de-France
- Department: Nord
- Arrondissement: Douai
- Canton: Orchies
- Intercommunality: CC Pévèle-Carembault

Government
  - Mayor (2020–2026): Ludovic Rohart
- Area^{1}: 10.92 km^{2} (4.22 sq mi)
- Elevation: 30 m (98 ft)
- Highest elevation: 49 m (161 ft)
- Lowest elevation: 22 m (72 ft)
- Population (2023): 8,396
  - Density: 768.9/km^{2} (1,991/sq mi)
- Time zone: UTC+01:00 (CET)
  - Summer (DST): UTC+02:00 (CEST)
- INSEE/Postal code: 59449 /59310
- ^{1} French Land Register data, which excludes lakes, ponds, glaciers > 1 km^{2} (0.386 sq mi or 247 acres) and river estuaries.

Orchies (French pronunciation: [ɔʁʃi]; Dutch: Oorschie) is a commune in the department of Nord in the Hauts-de-France region of French Flanders, northern France. Its inhabitants are called Orchésiens.

Orchies is the biggest town of the Pévèle. It is especially known for its Musée de la chicorée, the museum of chicory.

Orchies is twinned with Kelso in Scotland.

The French Romantic composer Clément Broutin (1851–1889) was born in Orchies. The politician Valérie Létard (1962-) was born in Orchies.

== Transport ==
Orchies railway station is served by TER Hauts-de-France. The station is situated on a junction between the Fives–Hirson railway and the Somain–Halluin railway.

== Population ==
Historical population
Year	Pop.	±% p.a.
1968	5,972	—
1975	5,756	−0.52%
1982	5,587	−0.42%
1990	6,945	+2.76%
1999	7,472	+0.82%
2007	8,379	+1.44%
2012	8,196	−0.44%
2017	8,828	+1.50%
2023	8,396	−0.83%
Source: INSEE

== Heraldry ==
Arms of Orchies	The arms of Orchies are blazoned : Argent, a lion sable armed and langued gules, in dexter chief a crosslet ?patty? within an orle gules.

== See also ==
- Communes of the Nord department
