= Ennevelin =

- Commune
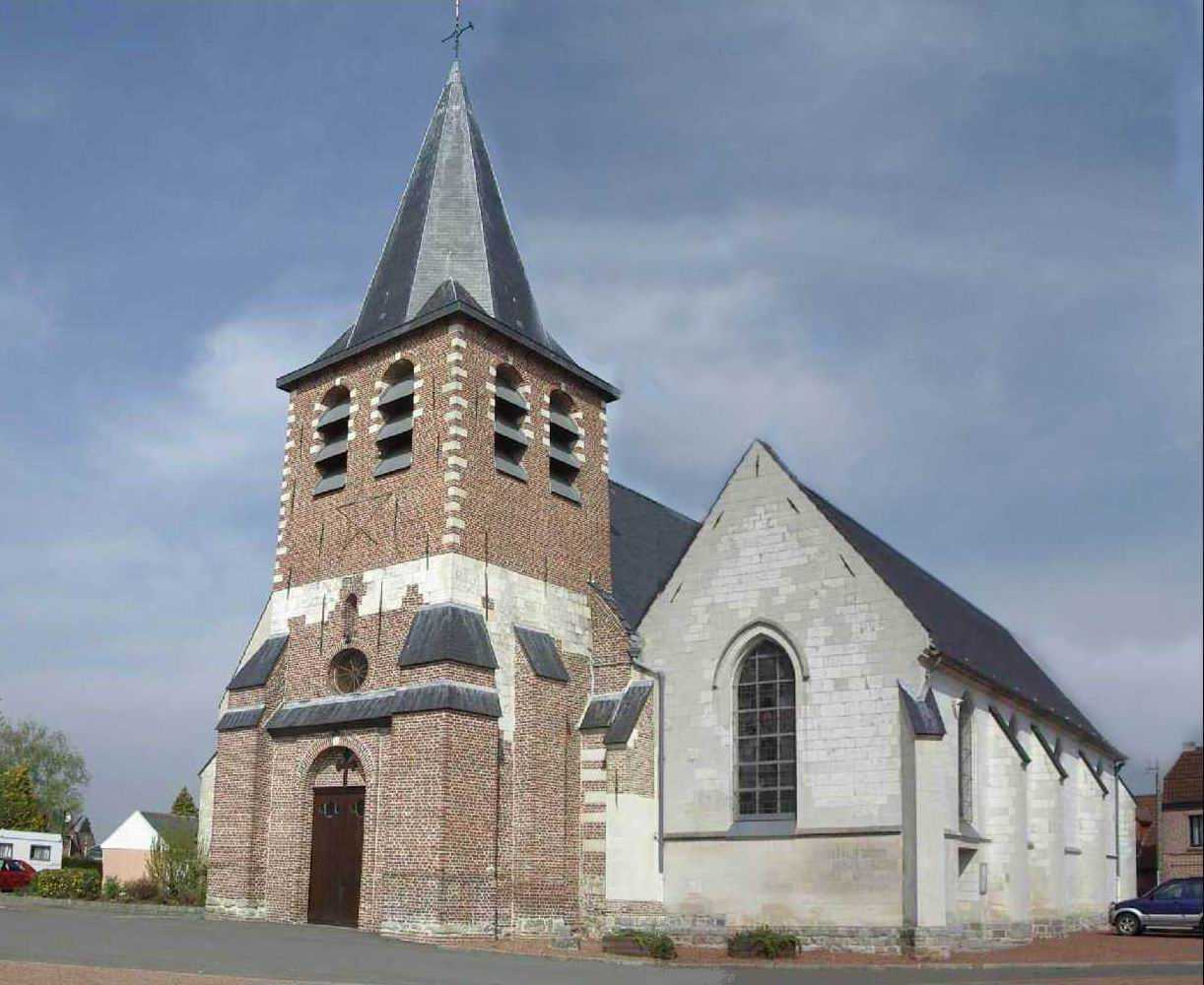
- The church in Ennevelin

- Coat of arms
- Location of Ennevelin
- Location within France Location within Hauts-de-France
- Coordinates: 50°32′32″N 3°07′49″E
- Country: France
- Region: Hauts-de-France
- Department: Nord
- Arrondissement: Lille
- Canton: Templeuve-en-Pévèle
- Intercommunality: Pévèle-Carembault

Government
  - Mayor (2020–2026): Michel Dupont
- Area^{1}: 9.92 km^{2} (3.83 sq mi)
- Elevation: 33 m (108 ft)
- Highest elevation: 42 m (138 ft)
- Lowest elevation: 26 m (85 ft)
- Population (2023): 2,416
  - Density: 244/km^{2} (631/sq mi)
- Time zone: UTC+01:00 (CET)
  - Summer (DST): UTC+02:00 (CEST)
- INSEE/Postal code: 59197 /59710
- ^{1} French Land Register data, which excludes lakes, ponds, glaciers > 1 km^{2} (0.386 sq mi or 247 acres) and river estuaries.

Ennevelin (French pronunciation: [ɛnvəlɛ̃]) is a commune in the Nord department in northern France.

== Population ==
Historical population
Year	Pop.	±% p.a.
1968	1,078	—
1975	1,210	+1.66%
1982	1,474	+2.86%
1990	1,792	+2.47%
1999	1,973	+1.07%
2007	2,190	+1.31%
2012	2,129	−0.56%
2017	2,185	+0.52%
2023	2,416	+1.69%
Source: INSEE

== Heraldry ==
Arms of Ennevelin	The arms of Ennevelin are blazoned : Per pale and barry Or and azure.

== See also ==
- Communes of the Nord department
