= Bersée =

- Commune
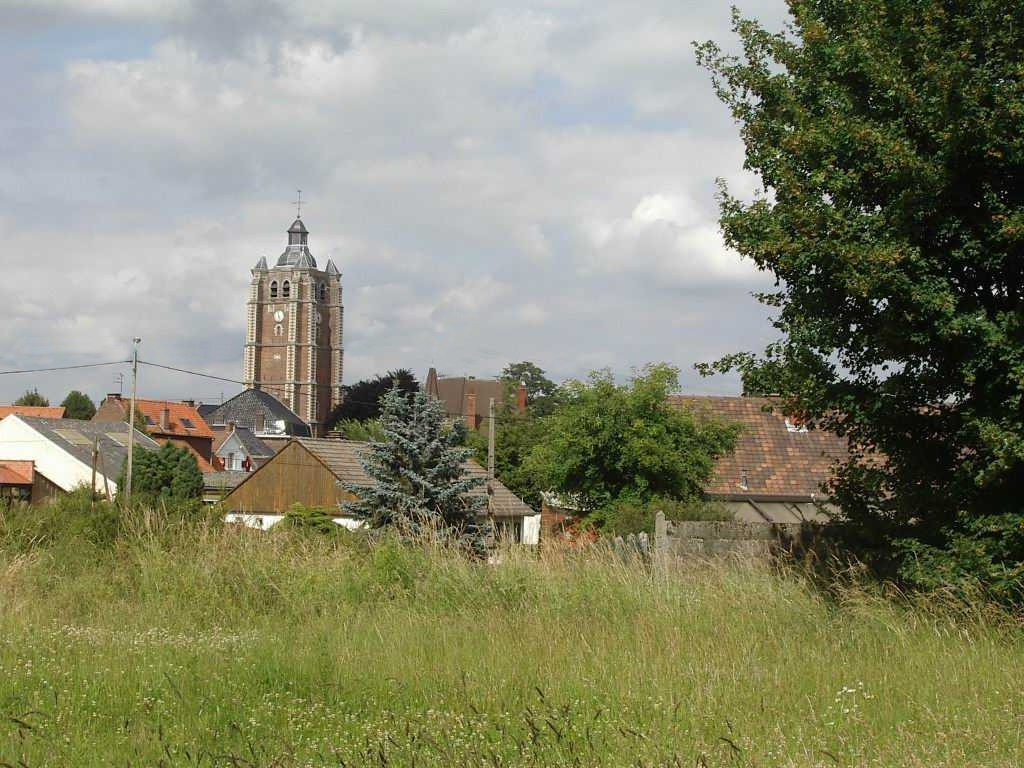
- The church tower at Bersée

- Coat of arms
- Location of Bersée
- Location within France Location within Hauts-de-France
- Coordinates: 50°28′57″N 3°08′44″E
- Country: France
- Region: Hauts-de-France
- Department: Nord
- Arrondissement: Lille
- Canton: Templeuve-en-Pévèle
- Intercommunality: Pévèle-Carembault

Government
  - Mayor (2020–2026): Arnaud Hottin
- Area^{1}: 10.93 km^{2} (4.22 sq mi)
- Elevation: 55 m (180 ft)
- Highest elevation: 61 m (200 ft)
- Lowest elevation: 27 m (89 ft)
- Population (2023): 2,318
  - Density: 212.1/km^{2} (549.3/sq mi)
- Time zone: UTC+01:00 (CET)
  - Summer (DST): UTC+02:00 (CEST)
- INSEE/Postal code: 59071 /59235
- ^{1} French Land Register data, which excludes lakes, ponds, glaciers > 1 km^{2} (0.386 sq mi or 247 acres) and river estuaries.

Bersée (French pronunciation: [bɛʁse]) is a commune in the Nord department in northern France.

== Population ==
Historical population

Year	Pop.	±% p.a.
1793	1,308	—
1821	1,530	+0.56%
1846	1,759	+0.56%
1872	1,812	+0.11%
1901	1,808	−0.01%
1926	1,573	−0.56%
1946	1,521	−0.17%
1962	1,526	+0.02%
1968	1,520	−0.07%

Year	Pop.	±% p.a.
1975	1,570	+0.46%
1982	1,806	+2.02%
1990	1,989	+1.21%
1999	2,120	+0.71%
2007	2,222	+0.59%
2012	2,238	+0.14%
2017	2,230	−0.07%
2023	2,318	+0.65%

Source: EHESS and INSEE (1968-2023)

== Heraldry ==
Arms of Bersée	The arms of Bersée are blazoned : Or, a cross gules between 16 alerions azure. (the Montmorency family and the communes of Bersée and Damville use the same arms.)

== See also ==
- Communes of the Nord department
