= Monchaux-sur-Écaillon =

- Commune
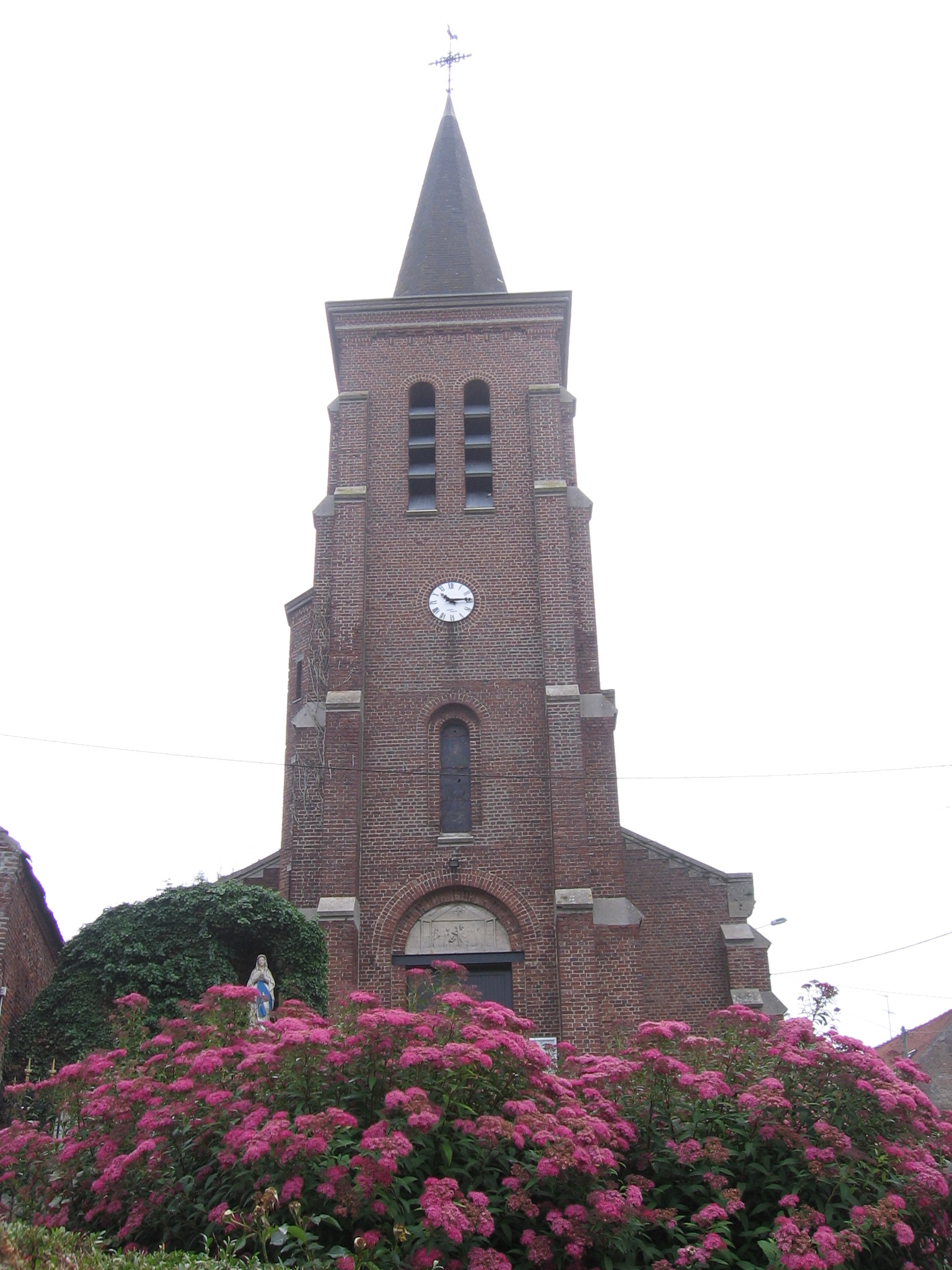
- The church in Monchaux-sur-Écaillon

- Coat of arms
- Location of Monchaux-sur-Écaillon
- Location within France Location within Hauts-de-France
- Coordinates: 50°17′14″N 3°27′22″E
- Country: France
- Region: Hauts-de-France
- Department: Nord
- Arrondissement: Valenciennes
- Canton: Aulnoy-lez-Valenciennes
- Intercommunality: Valenciennes Métropole

Government
  - Mayor (2020–2026): Bernard de Meyer
- Area^{1}: 4.55 km^{2} (1.76 sq mi)
- Elevation: 28 m (92 ft)
- Highest elevation: 84 m (276 ft)
- Lowest elevation: 31 m (102 ft)
- Population (2023): 616
  - Density: 135/km^{2} (351/sq mi)
- Time zone: UTC+01:00 (CET)
  - Summer (DST): UTC+02:00 (CEST)
- INSEE/Postal code: 59407 /59224
- ^{1} French Land Register data, which excludes lakes, ponds, glaciers > 1 km^{2} (0.386 sq mi or 247 acres) and river estuaries.

Monchaux-sur-Écaillon (French pronunciation: [mɔ̃ʃo syʁ ekajɔ̃], literally Monchaux on Écaillon) is a commune in the Nord department in northern France.

== Heraldry ==
Arms of Monchaux-sur-Écaillon	The arms of Monchaux-sur-Écaillon are blazoned : Argent, 5 bendlets gules and on a bordure sable, 8 bezants.

== See also ==
- Communes of the Nord department
