= Camphin-en-Pévèle =

- Commune
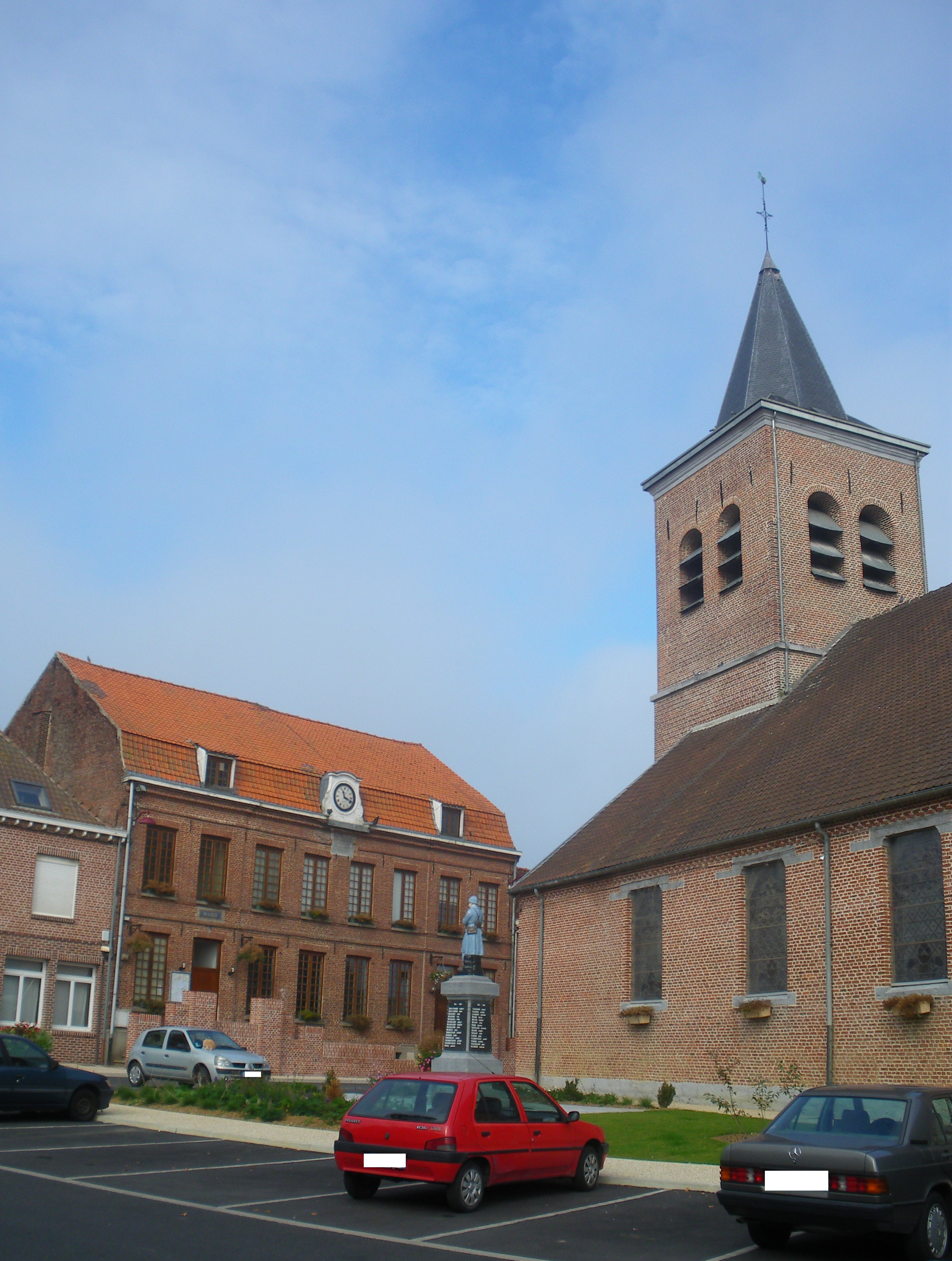
- A view within Camphin-en-Pévèle

- Coat of arms
- Location of Camphin-en-Pévèle
- Location within France Location within Hauts-de-France
- Coordinates: 50°35′46″N 3°15′38″E
- Country: France
- Region: Hauts-de-France
- Department: Nord
- Arrondissement: Lille
- Canton: Templeuve-en-Pévèle
- Intercommunality: Pévèle-Carembault

Government
  - Mayor (2020–2026): Olivier Vercruysse
- Area^{1}: 6.45 km^{2} (2.49 sq mi)
- Elevation: 50 m (160 ft)
- Highest elevation: 56 m (184 ft)
- Lowest elevation: 37 m (121 ft)
- Population (2023): 2,518
  - Density: 390/km^{2} (1,010/sq mi)
- Time zone: UTC+01:00 (CET)
  - Summer (DST): UTC+02:00 (CEST)
- INSEE/Postal code: 59124 /59780
- ^{1} French Land Register data, which excludes lakes, ponds, glaciers > 1 km^{2} (0.386 sq mi or 247 acres) and river estuaries.

Camphin-en-Pévèle (French pronunciation: [kɑ̃fɛ̃ ɑ̃ pevɛl]) is a commune in the Nord department in northern France.

== Population ==
Historical population
Year	Pop.	±% p.a.
1968	1,076	—
1975	1,123	+0.61%
1982	1,212	+1.10%
1990	1,341	+1.27%
1999	1,570	+1.77%
2007	1,670	+0.77%
2012	2,152	+5.20%
2017	2,452	+2.64%
2023	2,518	+0.44%
Source: INSEE

== Heraldry ==
Arms of Camphin-en-Pévèle	The arms of Camphin-en-Pévèle are blazoned : Azure, 7 bezants 3,3,1 (Or).

== See also ==
- Communes of the Nord department
