= Bourghelles =

- Commune
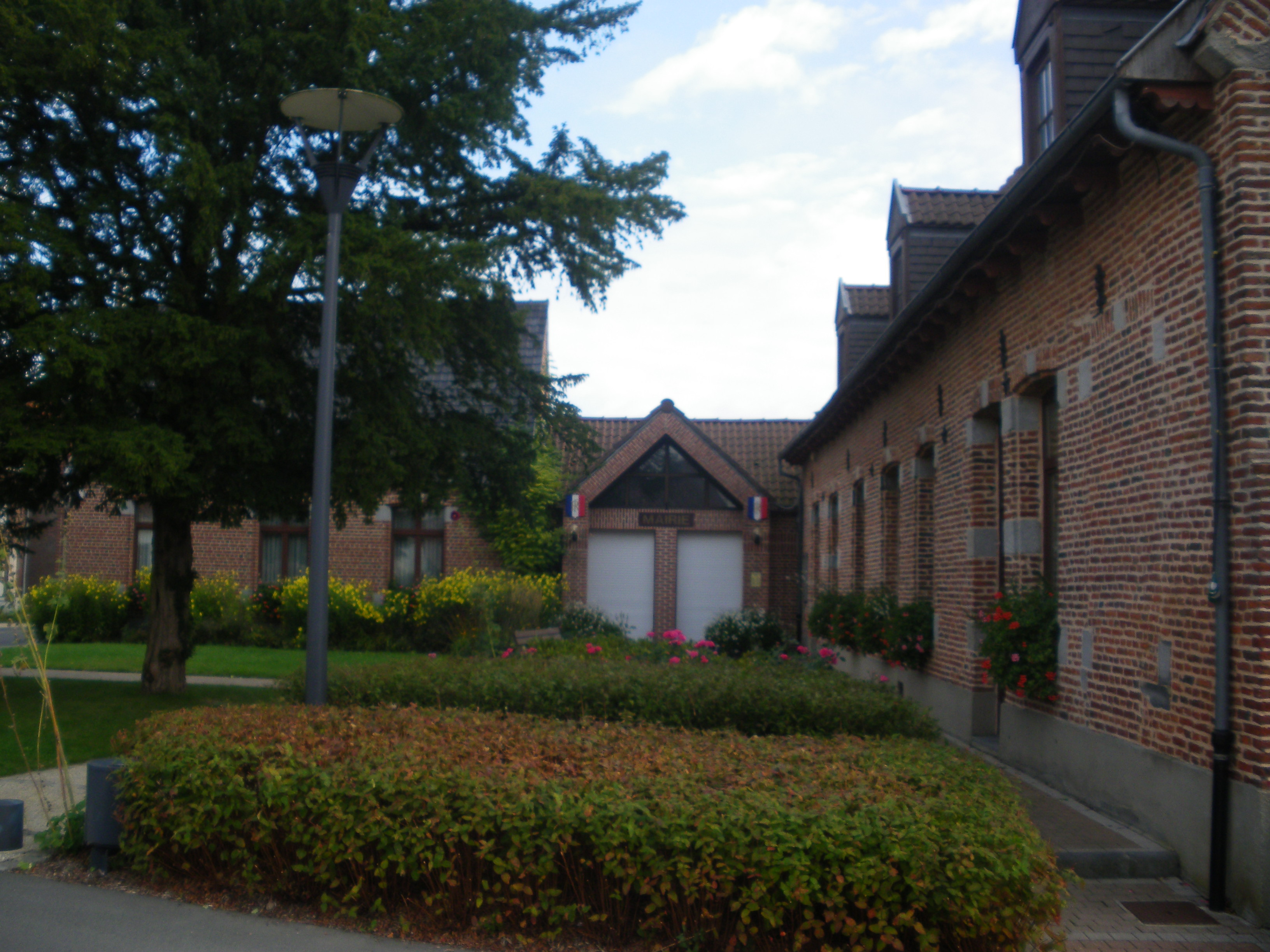
- The town hall in Bourghelles

- Coat of arms
- Location of Bourghelles
- Location within France Location within Hauts-de-France
- Coordinates: 50°33′56″N 3°14′39″E
- Country: France
- Region: Hauts-de-France
- Department: Nord
- Arrondissement: Lille
- Canton: Templeuve-en-Pévèle
- Intercommunality: CC Pévèle-Carembault

Government
  - Mayor (2020–2026): Franck Sarre
- Area^{1}: 6.55 km^{2} (2.53 sq mi)
- Elevation: 59 m (194 ft)
- Highest elevation: 71 m (233 ft)
- Lowest elevation: 32 m (105 ft)
- Population (2023): 1,682
  - Density: 257/km^{2} (665/sq mi)
- Time zone: UTC+01:00 (CET)
  - Summer (DST): UTC+02:00 (CEST)
- INSEE/Postal code: 59096 /59830
- ^{1} French Land Register data, which excludes lakes, ponds, glaciers > 1 km^{2} (0.386 sq mi or 247 acres) and river estuaries.

Bourghelles (French pronunciation: [buʁɡɛl]) is a commune in the Nord department in northern France.

== Etymology ==
First recorded in 1197 as Borghela (small fortress); ultimately from Proto-Germanic *burgs (hill fort, fortress) and diminutive suffix.

== Population ==
Historical population
Year	Pop.	±% p.a.
1968	922	—
1975	1,132	+2.97%
1982	1,160	+0.35%
1990	1,232	+0.76%
1999	1,418	+1.57%
2007	1,505	+0.75%
2012	1,616	+1.43%
2017	1,664	+0.59%
2023	1,682	+0.18%
Source: INSEE

== Heraldry ==
Arms of Bourghelles	The arms of Bourghelles are blazoned : Argent, a chief gules. (Bourghelles and Hem use the same arms.)

== See also ==
- Communes of the Nord department
