= Wattignies =

- Commune
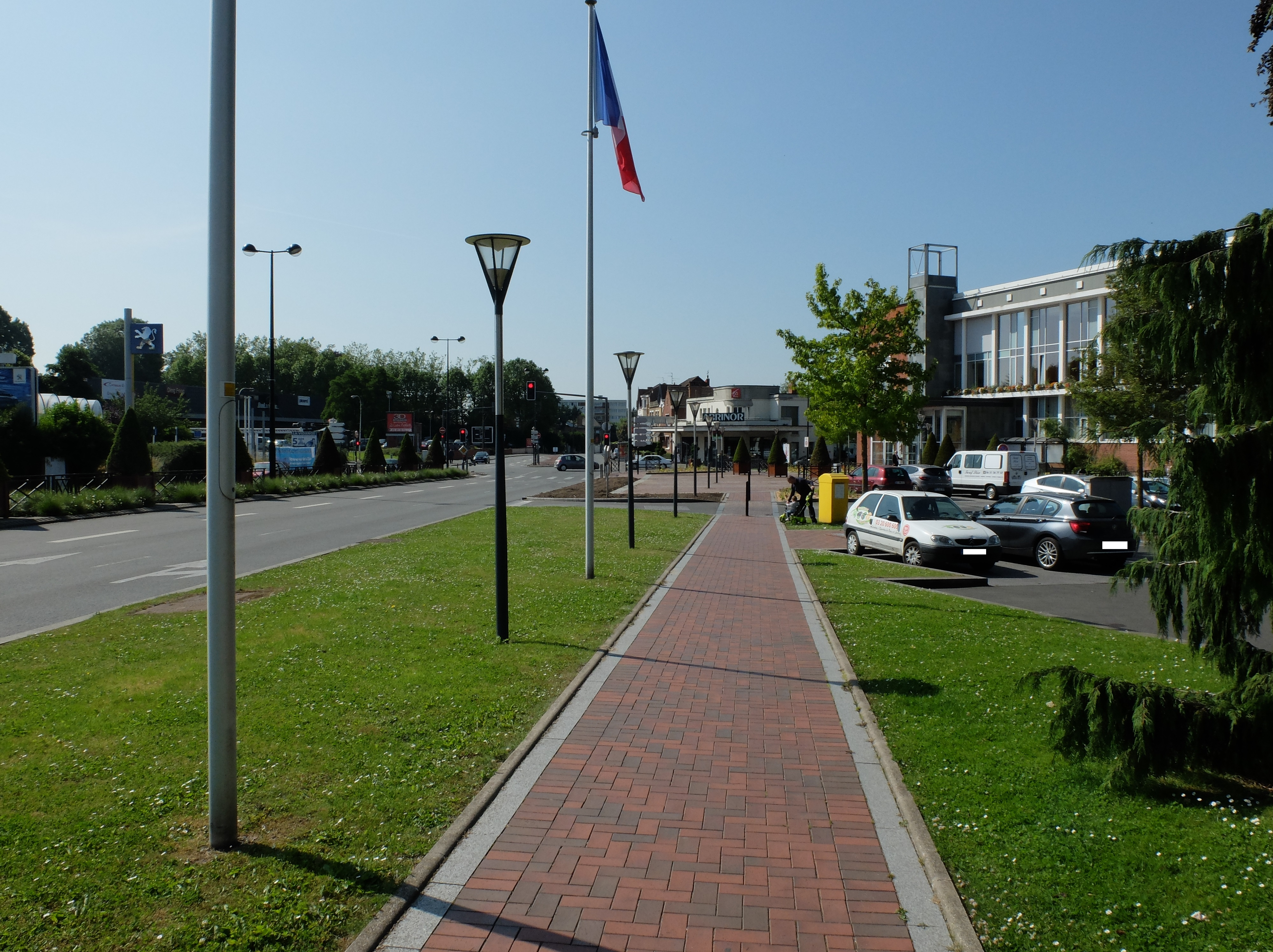
- A view within Wattignies

- Coat of arms
- Location of Wattignies
- Location within France Location within Hauts-de-France
- Coordinates: 50°35′08″N 3°02′38″E
- Country: France
- Region: Hauts-de-France
- Department: Nord
- Arrondissement: Lille
- Canton: Faches-Thumesnil
- Intercommunality: Métropole Lille

Government
  - Mayor (2020–2026): Alain Pluss
- Area^{1}: 6.31 km^{2} (2.44 sq mi)
- Elevation: 35 m (115 ft)
- Population (2023): 15,525
  - Density: 2,460/km^{2} (6,370/sq mi)
- Time zone: UTC+01:00 (CET)
  - Summer (DST): UTC+02:00 (CEST)
- INSEE/Postal code: 59648 /59139
- ^{1} French Land Register data, which excludes lakes, ponds, glaciers > 1 km^{2} (0.386 sq mi or 247 acres) and river estuaries.

Wattignies (French pronunciation: [watiɲi]; Dutch: Wattenijs) is a commune in the Nord department of northern France. It lies in the south-western part of the Lille conurbation. It covers an area of 6.31 square kilometres (2.44 sq mi).

== Neighboring communes ==
Lille, Faches-Thumesnil, Templemars, Seclin, Noyelles-lès-Seclin, Emmerin and Loos-lez-Lille.

== Heraldry ==
Arms of Wattignies	The arms of Wattignies are blazoned : Or, a saltire embattled counter-embattled sable.

== Population ==
Historical population
Year	Pop.	±% p.a.
1968	5,969	—
1975	12,319	+10.91%
1982	13,790	+1.62%
1990	14,533	+0.66%
1999	14,440	−0.07%
2007	13,450	−0.88%
2012	13,376	−0.11%
2017	14,549	+1.70%
2023	15,525	+1.09%
Source: INSEE

== Twin towns ==
Wattignies is twinned with:

- (England) Broadstairs, United Kingdom – since 1982
- Rodenkirchen, Germany – since 1973

== See also ==
- Communes of the Nord department
