= Konstantin Osvet =

Estonian journalist and caricaturist (1889–1946)

- Born: May 20, 1889; Kärmu or Vanamõisa, Haljala Parish, Estonia
- Died: April 3, 1946 (aged 56); Leningrad, USSR
- Occupations: Journalist; caricaturist

Konstantin Osvet (pseudonyms including K. Vibulane, Salmi-Jaak, and Leeno Tuvvike; May 20, 1889 – April 3, 1946) was an Estonian journalist and caricaturist.

== Early life and education ==
Konstantin Osvet was born in Kärmu or Vanamõisa, Haljala Parish, the son of the school teacher Hans Osvet (1852–1933) and Mili Osvet (née Aalmann, 1853–1917). He studied at the primary school and town school in Rakvere, and he was late home schooled.

== Career ==
For one year Osvet worked as a substitute school teacher. He also briefly worked in businesses in Narva and Tallinn.

Osvet started contributing to newspapers and magazines as early as 1905. His first works—satirical verses and caricatures—were published under the pseudonym K. Vibulane. Starting in 1914, he worked as a professional journalist in the editorial office of the newspaper Meie Tallinna Ajaleht. During the First World War I (1915–1918), he worked as an office clerk at the Lessner factory in Saint Petersburg, and he was also the editor of the humor and satire magazine Wana Meie Mats. From 1918 to 1921, he worked as an accountant in several institutions in Omsk.

In 1921, Osvet returned to Estonia, and from 1921 to 1935 he worked in the editorial office of the newspaper Kaja. He contributed to the humor magazine Tuuslar in 1922. After the founding of Uus Eesti, he worked in its editorial office from 1935 to 1939. In 1940 he worked in the editorial office of Tallinna Post and in 1940 to 1941 in the editorial office of Rahva Hääl.

Konstantin Osvet was arrested on November 13, 1944, at Sitsi 10–1 in Tallinn. On September 8, 1945, a tribunal sentenced him to eight years' imprisonment under Article 58-3 ("contacts with foreigners with counter-revolutionary purposes"). He died on April 3, 1946, at the prison in Leningrad.

== Awards and recognitions ==
- 1940: Order of the Estonian Red Cross, 4th class
