= Friedrich Rupp =

German Luftwaffe pilot (1917–1943)

- Born: 26 November 1917; Freiburg im Breisgau, German Empire
- Died: 15 May 1943 (aged 25); North Sea
- Cause of death: Killed in action
- Military career
- Allegiance: Nazi Germany
- Branch: Luftwaffe
- Service years: 1939–1943
- Rank: Oberleutnant (Posthumously)
- Nickname: "Frieder"
- Unit: JG 54
- Conflicts: World War II: Invasion of Poland; Battle of France; Operation Barbarossa; Defense of the Reich
- Awards: Knight's Cross of the Iron Cross

Friedrich "Frieder" Albert Ragnar Rupp (26 November 1917 – 15 May 1943) was a Luftwaffe ace and recipient of the Knight's Cross of the Iron Cross during World War II. The Knight's Cross of the Iron Cross, and its variants were the highest awards in the military and paramilitary forces of Nazi Germany during World War II. Rupp was shot down on 15 May 1943 over the North Sea, he was posthumously promoted to Oberleutnant. During his career he was credited with 52 victories, 50 over the Eastern Front and 2 over the Western Front.

== Early life and career ==
Rupp was born on 26 November 1917 in Freiburg im Breisgau, at the time in the Grand Duchy of Baden of the German Empire. Rupp joined the military service in the Luftwaffe and following flight training, (Note: Flight training in the Luftwaffe progressed through the levels A1, A2 and B1, B2, referred to as A/B flight training. A training included theoretical and practical training in aerobatics, navigation, long-distance flights and dead-stick landings. The B courses included high-altitude flights, instrument flights, night landings and training to handle the aircraft in difficult situations.) he served as an aerial reconnaissance pilot with 1. Staffel (1st squadron) with Aufklärungsgruppe 31 in September 1939.

== World War II ==
World War II in Europe had begun on Friday 1 September 1939 when German forces invaded Poland. During the invasion, Rupp flew the Henschel Hs 126 observation aircraft in support of the VIII. Army Corps. From October 1940 to April 1941 he received fighter pilot training and was then posted to 9. Staffel of Jagdgeschwader 54 (JG 54–54th Fighter Wing).

On 6 November 1942 following aerial combat with Bell P-39 Airacobra fighters, Rupp made a belly landing in his Messerschmitt Bf 109 G-2 (Werknummer 10420—factory number).

=== Defense of the Reich and death ===
In mid-February 1943, III. Gruppe of JG 54 was withdrawn from the Eastern Front and ordered to Vendeville, France where it was subordinated to the Geschwaderstab (headquarters unit) of Jagdgeschwader 26 "Schlageter" (JG 26—26th Fighter Wing). The Gruppe was equipped with the Messerschmitt Bf 109 G-4 armed with 20 mm MG 151/20 cannons installed in conformal gun pods under the wings. The original plan was to exchange JG 26 which had been fighting on the Western Front with JG 54. The plan was cancelled in March. Instead of III. Gruppe of JG 54 returning to the Eastern Front, the Gruppe was ordered to Bad Zwischenahn on 25 March and then to Oldenburg Airfield two days later. Here, the Gruppe was subordinated to the 2. Jagd-Division (2nd Fighter Division) which was fighting in defense of the Reich.

On 17 April, III. Gruppe flew its first combat mission in defense of the Reich. That day, the United States Army Air Forces (USAAF) VIII Bomber Command, later renamed to Eighth Air Force, attacked the Focke-Wulf factory in Bremen. The Gruppe was scrambled at 12:29. At 12:40 approximately 120 to 150 Boeing B-17 Flying Fortress bombers were encountered west of Wilhelmshaven. Due to evasive maneuvering of the bombers and the heavy defensive gunfire, the Gruppe initially failed to attack the bombers head-on. At 13:00, III. Gruppe made their first head-on attack while the leading bombers of the 91st and 306th Bombardment Group made their bomb-run. The Gruppe kept pursuing the bombers and claimed four further bombers shot down. Although Rupp did not file a claim in this aerial battle, his Bf 109 G-4 (Werknummer 16151—factory number) was hit by the defensive gun fire of the bombers, sustaining 20% combat damage. On 14 May, Rupp claimed his first heavy bomber shot down. That day, the VIII Bomber Command attacked the harbor and ship building at Kiel. III. Gruppe was scrambled at 11:29 and shortly after 12:00 intercepted 125 Consolidated B-24 Liberator bombers of the 44th Bombardment Group after they had dropped their bombs over the target area. In this encounter, III. Gruppe pilots claimed three B-24 bombers shot down, including one by Rupp.

The next day, Rupp was killed in action following aerial combat with USAAF B-17 bombers. His Bf 109 G-4 (Werknummer 16151) crashed into the North Sea west of Heligoland. VIII Bomber Command had attacked Emden and Wilhelmshaven. Elements of the 1st Bombardment Wing failed to find their targets, thus mainly attacking Heligoland with a few bombers dropping bombs on Wangeroog and Emden. III. Gruppe had been scrambled at 10:05 and intercepted the bombers shortly before they reached Heligoland. In the resulting encounter, five B-17 bombers were claimed shot down. Three bombers were later confirmed destroyed while two remained unconfirmed, including one by Rupp. III. Gruppe lost four Bf 109s that day, including Rupp and Hauptmann Günter Fink, the commander of 8. Staffel. Four weeks later, Rupp's body was washed ashore near Cuxhaven and buried on 19 June. Posthumously, he was promoted to Oberleutnant (first lieutenant).

== Summary of career ==
=== Aerial victory claims ===
According to US historian David T. Zabecki, Rupp was credited with 52 aerial victories. Obermaier and Scutts also list him with 52 aerial victories, including two heavy bombers, claimed in an unknown number of combat missions. Mathews and Foreman, authors of Luftwaffe Aces — Biographies and Victory Claims, researched the German Federal Archives and found records for 51 aerial victory claims, plus one further unconfirmed claim, all but one four-engined heavy bomber were claimed on the Eastern Front.

Victory claims were logged to a map-reference (PQ = Planquadrat), for example "PQ 20123". The Luftwaffe grid map (Jägermeldenetz) covered all of Europe, western Russia and North Africa and was composed of rectangles measuring 15 minutes of latitude by 30 minutes of longitude, an area of about 360 square miles (930 km^{2}). These sectors were then subdivided into 36 smaller units to give a location area 3 km × 4 km (1.9 mi × 2.5 mi) in size.

Chronicle of aerial victories
This and the – (dash) indicates unconfirmed aerial victory claims for which Rupp did not receive credit. This and the ? (question mark) indicates information discrepancies listed by Prien, Stemmer, Rodeike, Bock, Mathews and Foreman.
Claim	Date	Time	Type	Location	Claim	Date	Time	Type	Location
– 9. Staffel of Jagdgeschwader 54 – Operation Barbarossa — 22 June – 5 December 1941
1	24 August 1941	12:30	I-16	Kärmu	—	11 October 1941	—	ground-attack aircraft	
2	6 October 1941	16:20	I-153? (Note: According to Mathews and Foreman claimed as a Polikarpov I-15.)	north of the Neva bend	4	30 October 1941	09:55	I-26 (Yak-1)	Kobona
3	11 October 1941	07:40	I-26 (Yak-1)	Ladoskoje					
– 9. Staffel of Jagdgeschwader 54 – Eastern Front — 6 December 1941 – January 1942
5	1 January 1942? (Note: According to Mathews and Foreman claimed on 2 January 1942.)	10:55	I-16	Kobona	6	2 January 1942	09:43	I-26 (Yak-1)	Kirishi
– 7. Staffel of Jagdgeschwader 54 – Eastern Front — February – 30 April 1942
7	14 March 1942	15:32	R-5	Malaya Vishera	13	22 March 1942	13:22	I-26? (Note: According to Mathews and Foreman claimed as a Mikoyan-Gurevich MiG-1.)	Aleksandrowskaja
8	16 March 1942	10:08	P-40	Spasskaya Polist	14	22 March 1942	13:25	I-26?	Aleksandrowskaja
9	16 March 1942	10:15	P-40	Spasskaya Polist	15	23 March 1942	15:57? (Note: According to Mathews and Foreman claimed at 15:53 over a Curtiss P-40 Warhawk.)	I-26	Pogostje
10	21 March 1942	17:48	P-40	Orenskij	16	23 March 1942	16:20	I-26? (Note: According to Mathews and Foreman claimed as a Curtiss P-40 Warhawk.)	Babino
11	22 March 1942	06:12	R-Z? (Note: According to Mathews and Foreman claimed as a Polikarpov R-5.)	Nowosselitschi	17	29 March 1942	08:25	I-26 (Yak-1)	Aleksandrowskaja
12	22 March 1942	13:18	I-26?	Malaya Vishera					
– 7. Staffel of Jagdgeschwader 54 – Eastern Front — 1 May 1942 – 3 February 1943
18	9 May 1942	05:40? (Note: According to Mathews and Foreman claimed at 06:40.)	Yak-1	Malaya Vishera	35	23 September 1942	11:53? (Note: According to Mathews and Foreman claimed at 11:33.)	MiG-3	PQ 20123, Volkhovstroy west of Volkhov
19	29 May 1942	06:50	P-40	PQ 20137, Volkhovstroy	36	29 September 1942	11:34	Hurricane	PQ 01884, Schtscheglowo; 20 km (12 mi) northwest of Shlisselburg
20	2 June 1942	08:47	P-40	Lake Szochloje	37	1 October 1942	11:23	Yak-1	PQ 00262, Marino; 10 km (6.2 mi) southwest of Shlisselburg
21	20 August 1942	12:47	LaGG-3	PQ 00253, north of Pustatschij; 15 km (9.3 mi) west-southwest of Shlisselburg	38	4 October 1942	09:22	I-16	PQ 00263, Nowy Poselok; 10 km (6.2 mi) southwest of Shlisselburg
22	22 August 1942	10:38	LaGG-3	PQ 00193, Stowaja; 10 km (6.2 mi) north of Pushkin	39	6 October 1942	16:55	Yak-1	PQ 10271, Aleksandrowskaja; 25 km (16 mi) east-southeast of Mga
23	27 August 1942	12:32	LaGG-3	PQ 10184, Gaitolowo east of Mga	40	31 October 1942	07:35	LaGG-3	PQ 29773, Pustynko; 40 km (25 mi) east-southeast of Staraya Russa
24	2 September 1942	05:17	Yak-1	PQ 10163, west of Putilowo; 10 km (6.2 mi) southwest of Shlisselburg	41	5 November 1942	10:02	Yak-1	PQ 18261, Chowelko; 30 km (19 mi) east-southeast of Staraya Russa
25	2 September 1942	18:32? (Note: According to Mathews and Foreman claimed at 18:30.)	LaGG-3	PQ 00262, Dubrowka southeast of Shlisselburg	42	14 November 1942	11:25	P-40	PQ 20142, Sadnewo south-southwest of Volkhov
26	4 September 1942	09:11	LaGG-3	PQ 10353, Schum; 30 km (19 mi) west-southwest of Shlisselburg	43	14 November 1942	11:31	P-40	PQ 20151, Sadnewo
27	4 September 1942	09:15	LaGG-3	PQ 10254, Schum; 20 km (12 mi) southeast of Mga	44	16 December 1942	08:10	LaGG-3	7 km (4.3 mi) southeast of Velikiye Luki
28	5 September 1942	18:32	Il-2	PQ 00311, Krasnoje Selo	45	29 December 1942	08:17	Il-2	PQ 07593, southeast of Fedkowo
29	6 September 1942	17:47	P-40	PQ 10243, Nasija; 25 km (16 mi) east-southeast of Shlisselburg	46	29 December 1942	08:23	Il-2	PQ 07734, Dno
30	11 September 1942	08:42	LaGG-3	PQ 10183, Gaitolowo east of Mga	47	29 December 1942	08:27	Il-2	PQ 07734, Pewkowo; 15 km (9.3 mi) south of Velikiye Luki
31	11 September 1942	13:45	Pe-2	PQ 10174, Sinjawino vicinity of Mga	48	30 December 1942	09:25	La-5	PQ 07552, Schugorowo; 15 km (9.3 mi) east-southeast of Velikiye Luki
32	11 September 1942	13:51	Pe-2	PQ 10182, Kilosi east of Mga	49	30 December 1942	11:10	LaGG-3	PQ 07683, Michalk; 10 km (6.2 mi) southeast of Velikiye Luki
33	12 September 1942	08:49	Yak-1	PQ 10284; 35 km (22 mi) west-southwest of Volkhov	50	30 December 1942	12:58	Pe-2	PQ 07671, Velikiye Luki; 15 km (9.3 mi) west of Velikiye Luki
34	12 September 1942	14:02	Yak-1	PQ 10192, Poljana east of Mga					
– 7. Staffel of Jagdgeschwader 54 – Defense of the Reich — 27 March – 15 May 1944
51	14 May 1943	12:30	B-24	Surendorf; PQ 0551	—	15 May 1943	—	B-17 (Note: This unconfirmed claim is not listed by Mathews and Foreman.)	

=== Awards ===
- Iron Cross (1939) 2nd and 1st Class
- Honor Goblet of the Luftwaffe on 1 July 1942 as Leutnant and pilot
- German Cross in Gold on 27 October 1942 as Leutnant in the 7./Jagdgeschwader 54
- Knight's Cross of the Iron Cross on 24 January 1943 as Leutnant and pilot in the 7./Jagdgeschwader 54
