= Joseph Salmon (cellist) =

French cellist and teacher (1864–1943)

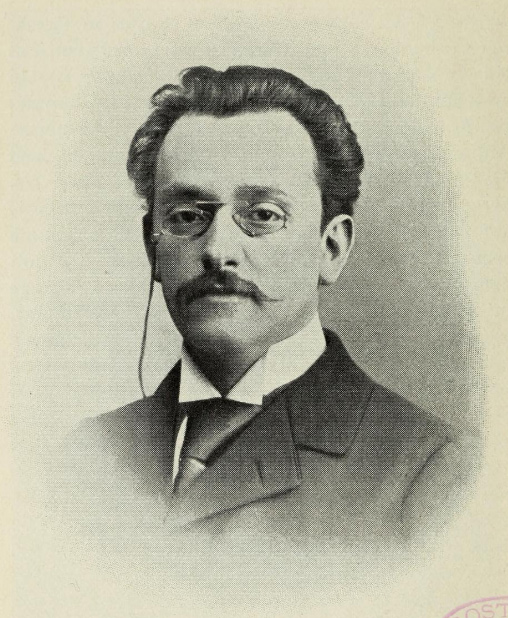
- Born: 5 April 1864; Aix, Nord, France
- Died: 31 October 1943 (aged 79); Aix, Nord, France
- Occupations: Cellist; Academic teacher
- Organizations: Hayot Quartet

Joseph Salmon (5 April 1864 – 31 October 1943) was a French cellist, composer and music editor.

Salmon was born in Aix. He studied cello in Paris with Auguste Franchomme. He was a cello professor in Paris, teaching Ricard Pichot Gironès, among others. As a music editor and composer, he published mainly cello music for publisher Éditions Durand and others. He played as a member of the Hayot Trio and Hayot Quartet, with violinist Maurice Hayot and violist Camille Chevillard. He was the cellist when Debussy's Cello Sonata was first played in France, in Paris on 24 March 1917, with the composer as the pianist.

Salmon died in Aix-en-Pévèle.
