= Günter Fink =

German Luftwaffe pilot (1918–1943)

- Born: 17 March 1918; Spandau
- Died: 15 May 1943 (aged 25) south of Heligoland
- Cause of death: Killed in action
- Military career
- Allegiance: Nazi Germany
- Branch: Luftwaffe
- Rank: Hauptmann (Captain)
- Units: JG 77, JG 54
- Commands: 8./JG 54
- Conflicts: World War II: Eastern Front; Defense of the Reich
- Awards: Knight's Cross of the Iron Cross

Günter Fink (17 March 1918 – 15 May 1943) was a German Luftwaffe ace and recipient of the Knight's Cross of the Iron Cross during World War II. The Knight's Cross of the Iron Cross, and its variants were the highest awards in the military and paramilitary forces of Nazi Germany during World War II. Fink was killed on 15 May 1943 after engaging in aerial combat with Boeing B-17 Flying Fortress bombers. During his career he was credited with 46 aerial victories, all on the Eastern Front.

== Early life and career ==
Fink was born on 17 March 1918 in Spandau, now a borough of Berlin, in the German Empire. He joined the military of service of the Luftwaffe and following flight and fighter pilot training in October 1942, (Note: Flight training in the Luftwaffe progressed through the levels A1, A2 and B1, B2, referred to as A/B flight training. A training included theoretical and practical training in aerobatics, navigation, long-distance flights and dead-stick landings. The B courses included high-altitude flights, instrument flights, night landings and training to handle the aircraft in difficult situations.) Fink was posted to I. Gruppe (1st group) of Jagdgeschwader 77 (JG 77—77th Fighter Wing).

== World War II ==
World War II in Europe began on Friday 1 September 1939 when German forces invaded Poland. Flying with JG 77, Fink flew missions over southern Germany and in Invasion of Poland. In late 1940, Fink was transferred to the III. Gruppe of Jagdgeschwader 54 (JG 54—54th Fighter Wing). On 29 March 1941, the Gruppe was ordered to Graz-Thalerhof in preparation for the Balkans campaign.

On 20 April, III. Gruppe was withdrawn from combat operation, relocating to Belgrad-Semlin. On 4 May, the Gruppe began its transfer to Airfield Stolp-Reitz in Pomerania, present-day Słupsk, by train, arriving at Stolp-Reitz on 10 May.

=== Operation Barbarossa ===
At Stolp-Reitz, JG 54 upgraded their aircraft to the Messerschmitt Bf 109 F-2. For the next four weeks, the pilots familiarized themselves with the new aircraft before on 15 June, III. Gruppe was ordered to Blumenfeld in East Prussia, present-day Karczarningken in the Kaliningrad Oblast, in preparation for Operation Barbarossa, the invasion of the Soviet Union. During the upcoming invasion, JG 54 would be deployed in the area of Army Group North, was subordinated to I. Fliegerkorps (1st Air Corps) and supported the 16th and 18th Army as well as the Panzer Group 4 in their strategic objective to reach Leningrad.

On 29 June, III. Gruppe relocated to Daugavpils, known as Dünaburg to the Germans, to provide fighter protection for German ground forces crossing the Daugava. Here on 5 July, Fink claimed his first aerial victory, an I-18 which was an early war Luftwaffe designation for the Mikoyan-Gurevich MiG-1 fighter.

In June 1942, Fink flew night fighter combat missions on the Eastern Front in support of German forces which had encircled the Soviet 2nd Shock Army during the Battle of Lyuban. On the night of 7/8 June, he claimed four Polikarpov R-5 bombers shot down. In the night of 10/11 June, he was credited with the destruction of three further R-5 bombers destroyed and a Lisunov Li-2 also known as a PS-84. The next night, Fink again claimed a R-5 bomber shot down followed by a further PS-84 claimed on the night of 14/15 June. He claimed his last nocturnal aerial victory on the night 24/25 June, another R-5 bomber, taking his total to eleven nocturnal aerial victories claimed.

On 9 August 1942, Fink was appointed Staffelkapitän (squadron leader) of 8. Staffel of JG 54, succeeding Oberleutnant Max-Hellmuth Ostermann who had been killed in action. Fink had already temporarily led the Staffel from 12 May until early August while Ostermann was on home-leave.

=== Defense of the Reich and death ===
In mid-February 1943, III. Gruppe of JG 54 was withdrawn from the Eastern Front and ordered to Vendeville, France where it was subordinated to the Geschwaderstab (headquarters unit) of Jagdgeschwader 26 "Schlageter" (JG 26—26th Fighter Wing). The Gruppe was equipped with the Bf 109 G-4 armed with 20 mm MG 151/20 cannons installed in conformal gun pods under the wings. The original plan was to exchange JG 26 which had been fighting on the Western Front with JG 54. The plan was cancelled in March. Instead of III. Gruppe of JG 54 returning to the Eastern Front, the Gruppe was ordered to Bad Zwischenahn on 25 March and then to Oldenburg Airfield two days later. Here, the Gruppe was subordinated to the 2. Jagd-Division (2nd Fighter Division) which was fighting in defense of the Reich.

On 14 March 1943, Fink had been awarded the Knight's Cross of the Iron Cross (Ritterkreuz des Eisernen Kreuzes) for 46 aerial victories claimed. Fink was posted as missing in action following aerial combat with United States Army Air Forces Boeing B-17 Flying Fortress bombers on 15 May 1943. His Bf 109 G-4 (Werknummer 14961—factory number) was last seen in a location 5–10 kilometers (3.1–6.2 miles) south of Heligoland over the North Sea. VIII Bomber Command had attacked Emden and Wilhelmshaven. Elements of the 1st Bombardment Wing failed to find their targets, thus mainly attacking Heligoland with a few bombers dropping bombs on Wangeroog and Emden. III. Gruppe had been scrambled at 10:05 and intercepted the bombers shortly before they reached Heligoland. In the resulting encounter, five B-17 bombers were claimed shot down. Three bombers were later confirmed destroyed while two remained unconfirmed, for the loss of four Bf 109s, including Fink and Leutnant Friedrich Rupp from 7. Staffel. In consequence, command of 8. Staffel was passed on to Oberleutnant Rudolf Patzak.

== Summary of career ==
=== Aerial victory claims ===
According to Obermaier, Fink was credited with 46 aerial victories. Mathews and Foreman, authors of Luftwaffe Aces — Biographies and Victory Claims, researched the German Federal Archives and found records for 48 aerial victory claims, all of which claimed on the Eastern Front.

Victory claims were logged to a map-reference (PQ = Planquadrat), for example "PQ 25 Ost 2812". The Luftwaffe grid map (Jägermeldenetz) covered all of Europe, western Russia and North Africa and was composed of rectangles measuring 15 minutes of latitude by 30 minutes of longitude, an area of about 360 square miles (930 km^{2}). These sectors were then subdivided into 36 smaller units to give a location area 3 km × 4 km (1.9 mi × 2.5 mi) in size.

Chronicle of aerial victories
This and the ? (question mark) indicates information discrepancies listed by Prien, Stemmer, Rodeike, Bock, Mathews, Foreman and Parry.
Claim	Date	Time	Type	Location	Claim	Date	Time	Type	Location
– 7. Staffel of Jagdgeschwader 54 – Operation Barbarossa — July 1941
1	5 July 1941	17:05	I-18 (MiG-1)		2	5 July 1941	20:07	SB-3	
– 2. Staffel of Ergänzungsgruppe/Jagdgeschwader 54 – Operation Barbarossa — August 1941
3	20 August 1941	11:45	I-153	PQ 25 Ost 2812					
– Stab III. Gruppe of Jagdgeschwader 54 – Eastern Front — 6 December 1941 – 30 April 1942
4	28 March 1942	16:40	I-26 (Yak-1)	north of Malaya Vishera	6	29 April 1942	11:20	Yak-1	
5	4 April 1942	10:37	Pe-2						
– 8. Staffel of Jagdgeschwader 54 – Eastern Front — 1 May 1942 – 3 February 1943
7	15 May 1942	14:45	P-40		26	2 September 1942	06:42	MiG-3	PQ 10244; Baltic Sea, 25 km (16 mi) east-southeast of Shlisselburg
8	7 June 1942	23:35	R-5	PQ 10783; Baltic Sea, 25 km (16 mi) northwest of Spaskaja-Polist	27	2 September 1942	13:53	MiG-3	PQ 10162; Baltic Sea, southeast of Shlisselburg
? (Note: This claim is not listed by Prien, Stemmer, Rodeike and Bock.)	7 June 1942	23:50	R-5		28	11 September 1942	13:40	LaGG-3	PQ 10141; Baltic Sea, south of Shlisselburg
9	8 June 1942	00:03? (Note: According to Mathews and Foreman claimed at 00:20.)	R-5		29	9 December 1942	08:37	Il-2	3 km (1.9 mi) north of Stawrina
10	8 June 1942	00:05	R-5	PQ 10761; Baltic Sea, 25 km (16 mi) south-southeast of Luban	30	16 December 1942	09:30	LaGG-3	2 km (1.2 mi) southwest of Velikiye Luki
11	10 June 1942	23:30	PS-84		31	17 December 1942	08:10	Il-2	PQ 07721; Baltic Sea, 20 km (12 mi) southwest of Velikiye Luki
12	10 June 1942	23:35	R-5		32	29 December 1942	12:32	LaGG-3	PQ 07633; Baltic Sea, 25 km (16 mi) northeast of Velikiye Luki
13	10 June 1942	23:52	R-5	PQ 19133; Baltic Sea, Spaskaja-Polist	33	30 December 1942	12:02	LaGG-3	PQ 07663; Baltic Sea, 25 km (16 mi) east of Velikiye Luki
?	10 June 1942	23:53	R-5		34	5 January 1943	08:24	Il-2	PQ 07723; Baltic Sea, 20 km (12 mi) southwest of Velikiye Luki
14	11 June 1942	23:10	R-5		35	5 January 1943	08:26	Il-2	PQ 07753; Baltic Sea, 20 km (12 mi) northeast of Nevel
15	14 June 1942	23:28	PS-84	PQ 19124; Baltic Sea, 20 km (12 mi) west of Spaskaja-Polist	36	5 January 1943	08:33	Il-2	PQ 07872; Baltic Sea, 30 km (19 mi) south-southeast of Velikiye Luki
16	25 June 1942	00:35	R-5		37	6 January 1943	08:57	LaGG-3	PQ 07582; Baltic Sea, 15 km (9.3 mi) southwest of Velikiye Luki
17	29 June 1942	11:45	LaGG-3	PQ 20731; Baltic Sea, 45 km (28 mi) east-northeast of Cudovo	38	6 January 1943	09:05	MiG-3	PQ 07594; Baltic Sea, 10 km (6.2 mi) southwest of Velikiye Luki
18	25 August 1942	12:05	MiG-3	PQ 29571; Baltic Sea, 45 km (28 mi) east-northeast of Staraya Russa	39	6 January 1943	09:09	LaGG-3	PQ 07564; Baltic Sea, 5 km (3.1 mi) west of Velikiye Luki
19	25 August 1942	10:05	Yak-1	PQ 18491; Baltic Sea, 30 km (19 mi) west-southwest of Demyansk	40	6 January 1943	11:03	LaGG-3	PQ 07673; Baltic Sea, 10 km (6.2 mi) southeast of Velikiye Luki
20	27 August 1942	15:15	I-16	PQ 10442; Baltic Sea, 30 km (19 mi) southeast of Mga	41	7 January 1943	07:55	Il-2	PQ 07674; Baltic Sea, 10 km (6.2 mi) southeast of Velikiye Luki
21	27 August 1942	18:09	Il-2	PQ 10313; Baltic Sea, 10 km (6.2 mi) south of Mga	42	7 January 1943	08:00	Il-2	PQ 07653; Baltic Sea, 20 km (12 mi) east of Velikiye Luki
22	27 August 1942	18:24	P-40	PQ 10154; Baltic Sea, southeast of Shlisselburg	43	7 January 1943	08:07	Il-2	PQ 07632; Baltic Sea, 25 km (16 mi) northeast of Velikiye Luki
23	27 August 1942	18:39	P-40	PQ 10252; Baltic Sea, 30 km (19 mi) west-southwest of Shlisselburg	44	14 January 1943	10:34	La-5	PQ 07644; Baltic Sea, 10 km (6.2 mi) east of Velikiye Luki
24	28 August 1942	18:16	LaGG-3	PQ 1024; Baltic Sea, 25 km (16 mi) east-southeast of Shlisselburg	45	15 January 1943	11:08	LaGG-3	PQ 07644; 10 km (6.2 mi) east of Velikiye Luki
25	2 September 1942	06:41	MiG-3	PQ 10244; Baltic Sea, 25 km (16 mi) east-southeast of Shlisselburg	46	17 January 1943	11:15	MiG-3	PQ 07651, Bolschaja; 1 km (0.62 mi) northwest of Bolschaja

=== Awards ===
- Iron Cross (1939) 2nd and 1st Class
- Honor Goblet of the Luftwaffe on 3 August 1942 as Oberleutnant and pilot
- German Cross in Gold on 27 October 1942 as Oberleutnant in the III./Jagdgeschwader 54
- Knight's Cross of the Iron Cross on 14 March 1943 as Oberleutnant and pilot in the 8./Jagdgeschwader 54
