= Cello Sonata (Debussy) =

Sonata for cello and piano by Debussy

- by Claude Debussy
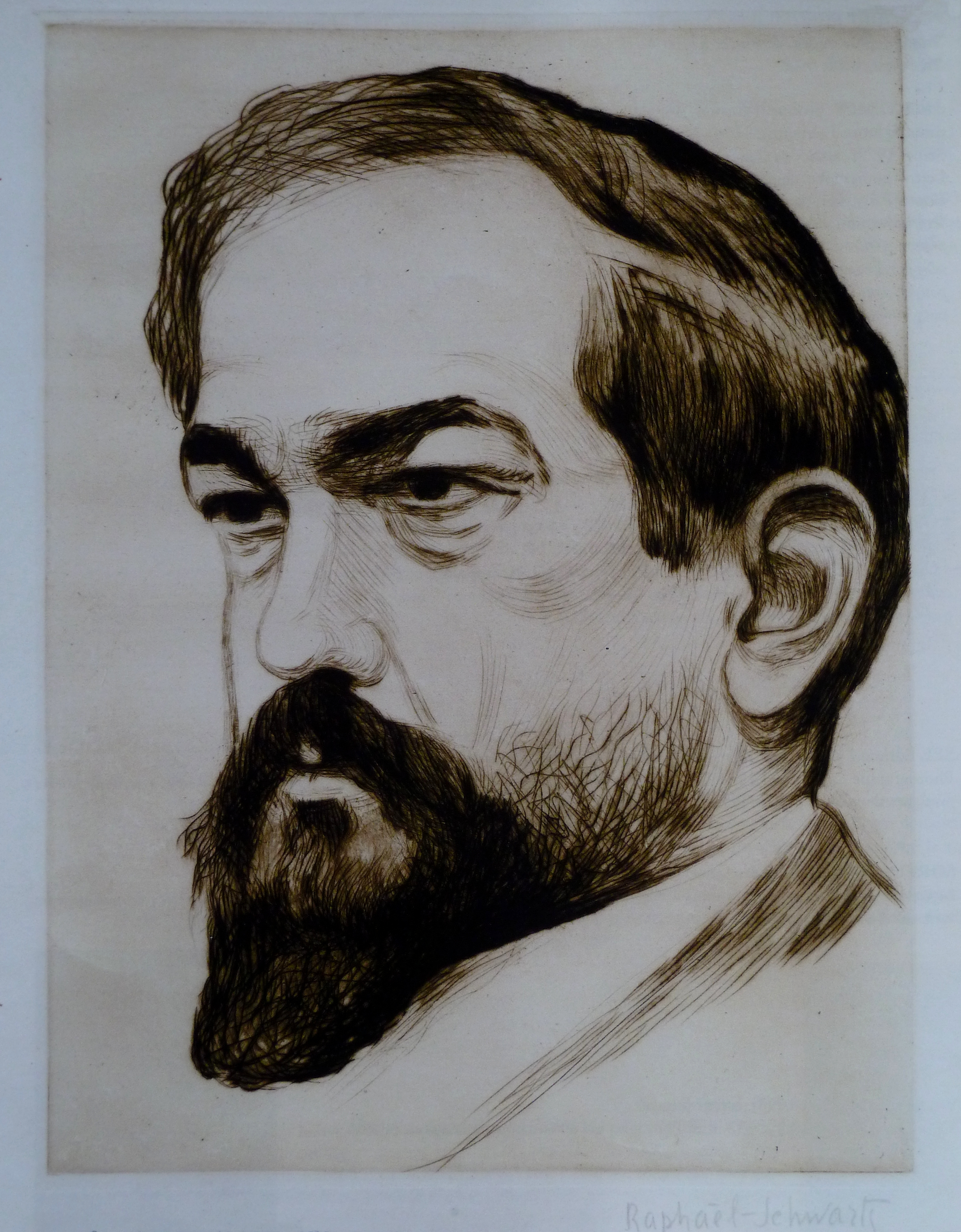
- Claude Debussy, 1912 portrait by Raphael Schwartz
- Catalogue: L. 135
- Composed: 1915
- Dedication: Emma Claude Debussy
- Performed: March 1917
- Published: 1915

The Cello Sonata (Sonate pour violoncelle et piano), L. 135, is a sonata for cello and piano by Claude Debussy. It consists of three movements: Prologue, Sérénade and Finale. It was composed and published in 1915. After performances in London and Geneva in 1916, the sonata's official premiere in Paris was played in 1917 by Joseph Salmon and Debussy. It was the first chamber music work in his late style, and became one of the key works in the repertoire from the 20th century.

== History and background ==
Debussy composed the cello sonata as the first in a project, Six sonatas for various instruments, to compose six sonatas for different instruments. It was prompted by a performance of the Septet by Saint-Saëns, inspiring Debussy to write chamber music again which he had neglected since his string quartet of 1893. Diagnosed with colorectal cancer in 1910, he had not composed at all. Debussy's publisher Durand encouraged the project, planned as an homage to 18th-century composers Couperin and Rameau. Throughout his career, he preferred the French keyboard music of the 18th century over German romanticism. Remaining in the French tradition was also a political statement during the World War. He described himself as a French musician on the title pages of project pieces.

Debussy planned three movements, as in French traditional sonatas. He had written many works in three movements such as Pour le piano, En blanc et noir, and Iberia.

Debussy composed the Cello Sonata as the first of the set within a few weeks in July at the Normandy seaside town of Pourville. He wrote to his publisher Durand on 5 August that he would send the manuscript of what he described as a sonata in "almost classical form in the best sense of the word". It was printed in December 1915.

Despite other information, the sonata was premiered in London's Aeolian Hall by cellist C. Warwick Evans and Ethel Hobday on 4 March 1916. It was played at the Casino Saint-Pierre in Geneva, performed by cellist Léonce Allard and Marie Panthès. It took until 24 March 1917 for the French premiere which was given in Paris by cellist Joseph Salmon and Debussy.

The cellist Louis Rosoor claimed in program notes that Debussy related the music to the character Pierrot of the commedia dell'arte, and wanted to name the sonata Pierrot Angry at the Moon. The cellist seems to have invented this, writing: "Pierrot wakes up with a start and shakes off his stupor. He rushes off to sing a serenade to his beloved [the moon] who, despite his supplications, remains unmoved. To comfort himself in his failure he sings a song of liberty." Debussy confirmed in a letter to Durand dated 16 October 1916 that the cellist had visited him the previous night, and seemed to have misunderstood him and the music.

Debussy dedicated the sonata, and actually the complete project, to his wife Emma, writing "Les Six Sonates pour divers instruments sont offertes en hommage à Emma-Claude Debussy (p.m.) Son mari Claude Debussy" (The six sonatas for various instruments are offered to honour Emma-Claude Debussy. Her husband.). He completed only three of the six planned sonatas, a second for viola, flute and harp in October 1915, and the third, a violin sonata, in the winter of 1916–17.

In 2008 Bärenreiter published a critical edition of the sonata, edited by Regina Back. She used Debussy's sketches from a private collection for the first time, dealing with the balance of the instruments and attempting to clarify ambiguities in the autograph and the first edition, many of which remain unresolvable.

The cello sonata became a staple of the modern cello repertoire and is commonly regarded as one of the finest masterpieces written for the instrument.

== Music ==
The piece makes use of modes and whole-tone and pentatonic scales, as is typical of Debussy's style. It also uses many types of extended cello technique, including left-hand pizzicato, spiccato and flautando bowing, false harmonics and portamenti. The piece is considered technically demanding. The work takes about 10 minutes to perform.

Debussy structured the sonata in three movements.All movements are in D minor, making the work homotonal.

1. Prologue: Lent, sostenuto e molto risoluto
2. Sérénade: Modérément animé
3. Finale: Animé, léger et nerveux

The final two movements are joined attacca. Instead of using sonata form, Debussy followed the models of eighteenth-century mono-thematic sonatas. He was especially influenced by the music of François Couperin.

=== I. Prologue ===
The first movement, Prologue, is in common time and marked (in Italian) as slow, sustained and very determined. It opens in the style of a French overture. A second motif is pentatonic. A middle section varies both ideas, and contains a cello cadenza. The movement ends in a "murmur" in D major.

=== II. Sérénade ===
The second movement is a serenade in common time and marked (in French) as moderately animated. It is structured in a modified bar form, like a song. The music has been described as almost improvisational and jazzy. It is full of chromaticism, and has been described as "ironic and voluptuous in character" and "capricious and choppy in speech", with Spanish elements. The first section consists of three motifs, with cello music reminiscent of a guitar. Its varied repetition uses flexible tempos. A contrasting section, marked Vivace (lively) in 3/8 time, uses extended cello techniques such as flautendo and flutter. It is followed by a shortened repeat of the varied section, with the music disintegrating, leading to the finale.

=== III. Finale ===
The third movement is in 2/4 time, marked (in French) as lively and nervous. It is in a modified rondo form. The refrain has been described as "frankly attacking". The first couplet is in Spanish style. After a modified refrain, a second couplet uses an element from the refrain in a slower tempo and marked molto rubato con morbidezza. The third version of the refrain leads to a coda marked appassionato ed animando (passionate and animating). The work closes with abrupt chords.

== Recordings ==
The Cello Sonata has been recorded often, played in recitals for cello and piano or in collections of Debussy's chamber music. In 1961, Mstislav Rostropovich and Benjamin Britten played it in concert at the Aldeburgh Festival in a concert for the premiere of Britten's Cello Sonata; They subsequently recorded all pieces on the program, playing Debussy's work with "a heightened sense of expressiveness". The Cello Sonata was recorded in 1991 by cellist François Guye and pianist Pascal Rogé together with the other two late sonatas. A reviewer from Gramophone noted that Guye played "sensitive nuances" and Rogé provided spontaneity and "the requisite spirit of caprice" in the second movement. It was recorded by cellist Edgar Moreau and pianist Bertrand Chamayou in 2017 in a collection of chamber music including the three late sonatas.

== Cited sources ==
- Barker, David (November 2017). "Claude Debussy (1862-1918) / Cello Sonata in D minor ..." musicweb-international.com.
- Begni, Gérard (22 January 2017). "Les trois Sonates de Claude Debussy" (PDF) (in French). Festival du Comminges.
- Clements, Andrew (3 May 2017). "Britten, Schubert, Debussy: Cello Sonatas review – how history was made in Aldeburgh". The Guardian.
- Hersh, Stefan (28 September 2021). "Reveries". guarnerihall.org.
- Lesure, François (1998). "Preface" (PDF). Henle. Archived from the original (PDF) on 19 September 2019.
- Salter, Lionel (May 1991). "Debussy Sonatas". Gramophone.
- Sensbach, Stephen (2001). French Cello Sonatas, 1871–1939. Liliput Press. ISBN 978-1-90-186661-2.
- Serinus, Jason Victor (9 May 2018). "Debussy Sonatas and Trios: Unforgettable Color and Texture". stereophile.com.
- Welsh, Moray (1992). "Behind the Moon-eyed Mask". moraywelsh.com.
- "Debussy, Claude / Sonata for Violoncello and Piano". Bärenreiter. 2022.
