= Verchain-Maugré =

- Commune
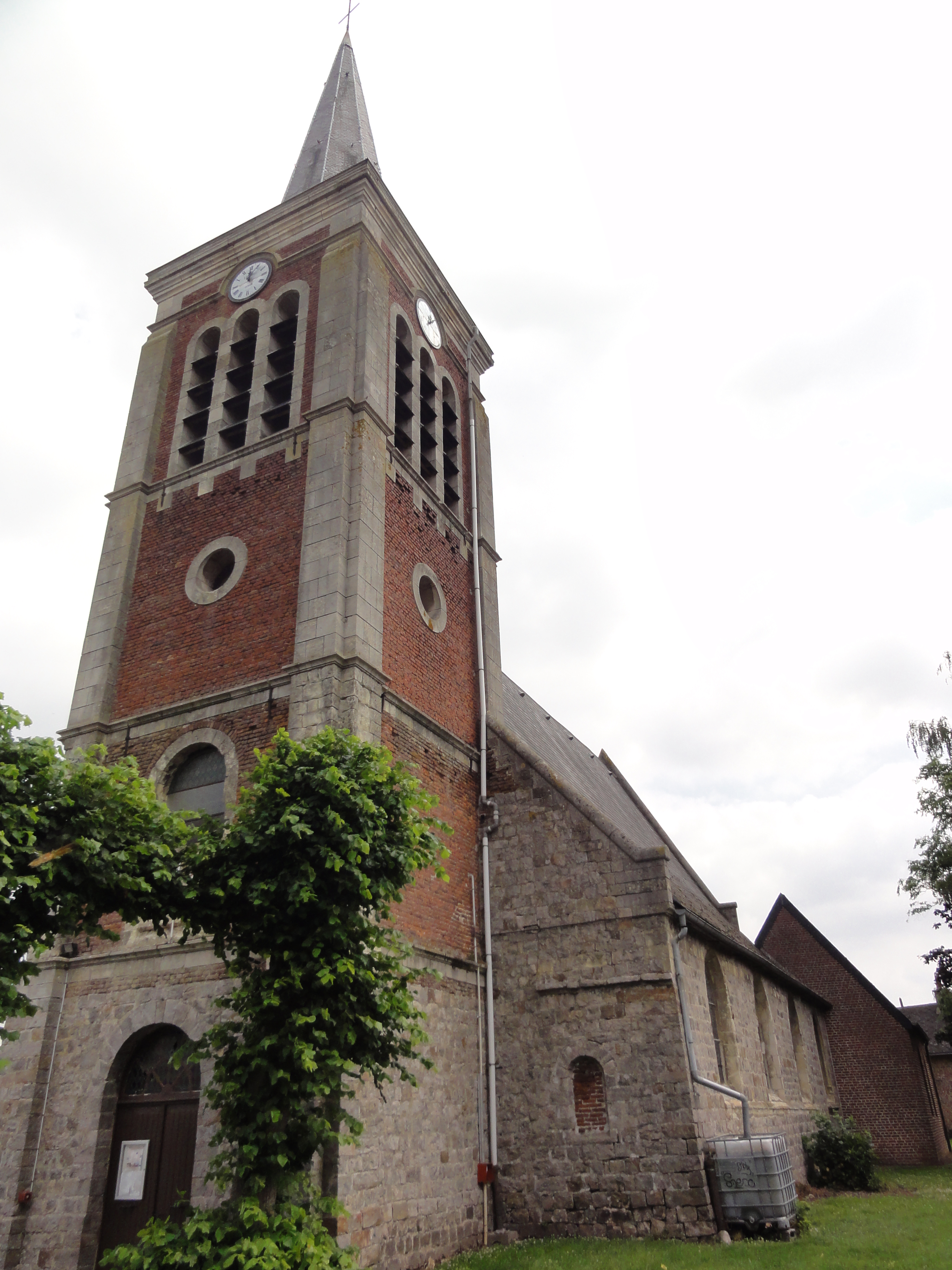
- The church in Verchain-Maugré

- Coat of arms
- Location of Verchain-Maugré
- Location within France Location within Hauts-de-France
- Coordinates: 50°16′07″N 3°28′39″E
- Country: France
- Region: Hauts-de-France
- Department: Nord
- Arrondissement: Valenciennes
- Canton: Aulnoy-lez-Valenciennes
- Intercommunality: CA Valenciennes Métropole

Government
  - Mayor (2020–2026): Christian Bisiaux
- Area^{1}: 9.62 km^{2} (3.71 sq mi)
- Elevation: 43 m (141 ft)
- Highest elevation: 88 m (289 ft)
- Lowest elevation: 32 m (105 ft)
- Population (2023): 1,103
  - Density: 115/km^{2} (297/sq mi)
- Time zone: UTC+01:00 (CET)
  - Summer (DST): UTC+02:00 (CEST)
- INSEE/Postal code: 59610 /59227
- ^{1} French Land Register data, which excludes lakes, ponds, glaciers > 1 km^{2} (0.386 sq mi or 247 acres) and river estuaries.

Verchain-Maugré (French pronunciation: [vɛʁʃɛ̃ moɡʁe]; in the Middle Ages, Werchin) is a commune in the Nord department in northern France.

Between 1383 and 1415, the poet and renowned jouster Jean de Werchin was the lord of Werchin.

== Heraldry ==
| Arms of Verchain-Maugré | The arms of Verchain-Maugré are blazoned : Azure, billetty, a lion argent, armed and langued gules. (La Longueville, Templemars, and Verchain-Maugré use the same arms.) |

== See also ==
- Communes of the Nord department
