= Camille Chevillard =

French composer and conductor

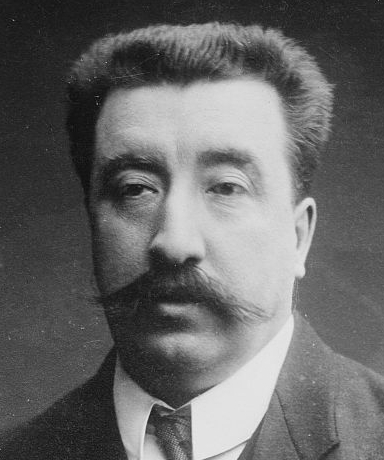
Camille Chevillard (1859-1923). Collection of the Library of Congress.

Paul Alexandre Camille Chevillard (14 October 1859 – 30 May 1923) was a French composer and conductor.

== Biography ==
According to Musiciens français d'Aujourd'hui, Camille Chevillard was the son of the famous cellist and composer Alexandre Chevillard, who taught at the Paris Conservatoire. He entered the Conservatoire in the piano class of Georges Mathias and graduated in 1880 with second prize. He never studied composition.

Chevillard began composing chamber music in 1882: first a quintet for piano and strings, then a quartet, a trio and sonatas, which were performed in various concerts, notably at the Société Nationale de Musique. He became voice coach for the Concerts-Lamoureux(1887) and in this capacity he took part in the "heroic and legendary" Paris premiere of Lohengrin at the Eden-Théâtre in 1887. On 17 April 1888, he married Marguerite Victoire Lamoureux (1861-1941), a singing teacher and daughter of Charles Lamoureux.

In 1889, together with Fritz Schneklud (the cellist in Gauguin's The Cellist), Albert Géloso, Lucien Capet and Monteux, he founded the 'Société de fondation Beethoven' and in 1890 was appointed second conductor of the Concerts-Lamoureux. These new functions gave him a taste for writing for the orchestra. His Ballade symphonique was first performed at the Concerts-Lamoureux on 23 February 1890. It was followed by the symphonic poem Le Chêne et le Roseau (8 March 1891), and the Fantaisie symphonique (21 October 1894). All three works are part of the Concerts-Lamoureux repertoire. The first performance of the "Trio Chevillard, Hayot, Salmon" (with Maurice Hayot, 1862-1945 and the cellist Joseph Salmon) took place in 1895. Finally, in 1897-1898, Chevillard regularly replaced Lamoureux, who had numerous engagements abroad. After the death of his father-in-law in 1899, he became the principal conductor of the Association des Concerts-Lamoureux.

As a conductor, he turned to the German and Russian Romantic repertoire, but he also conducted the Lamoureux Orchestra in the first performances of Pelléas et Mélisande (1901) by Gabriel Fauré, the Nocturnes (1900-1901) and especially La Mer (1905) by Claude Debussy and La Valse (1920) by Maurice Ravel. He promoted the music of Albéric Magnard.

In 1903, Camille Chevillard was made a Knight of the Legion of Honour. Also in 1903, he was awarded the Prix Chartier by the Académie des beaux-arts for his chamber music compositions Professor of Chamber Music at the Conservatoire from 1907, he also became musical director of the Opéra de Paris in 1914. There, in 1923, he premiered the ballet Cydalise et le Chèvre-pied by his friend Gabriel Pierné.

He died in Chatou.

His pupils included Suzanne Chaigneau, Clotilde Coulombe, Sophie Carmen Eckhardt-Gramatté, Yvonne Hubert, Eugeniusz Morawski, and Robert Soetens.

His wife Marguerite Chevillard is sometimes credited as Madame Camille Chevillard as translator into French of German song texts, e.g. Felix Weingartner's 3 Gedichte Op.17 published in 1894.

== Selected works ==
Stage

- La Roussalka, Incidental Music for the play by Édouard Schuré (Nouveau-Théâtre, le 23 mars 1903).

Orchestral

- Ballade symphonique, Op. 6 (1889)
- Le chêne et le roseau (The Oak and the Reed), Symphonic Poem after the fable by Jean de La Fontaine, Op. 7 (published Paris: Enoch, 1900)
- Fantaisie symphonique, Op. 10, 1893 (Leipzig: Breitkopf & Hartel).

Chamber music

- Piano Quintet in E♭ minor, Op. 1 (1882, Paris: Durand)
- Piano Trio, Op. 3 (1884), Paris: Durand
- Quatre pièces (4 Pieces) for viola (or violin) and piano, Op. 4 (1887). Paris: Enoch
- Sonata for violin and piano, Op. 8, 1892 (published Paris: Durand, 1894). (on YouTube by Jean-Jacques et Alexandre Kantorow)
- Quatre petites pièces (4 Little Pieces) for cello and piano, Op. 11 (1893). Paris: Durand
- Sonata in B♭ major for cello and piano, Op. 15 (1896). Paris: Durand. Given at Palazzetto Bru Zane, 15 October 2024 by Aurélien Pascal and Josquin Otal, the concert will be repeated at the Musée d'Orsay, Paris, on 29 April 2025. The programme also includes Louis Dumas (Lamento), Jean Huré (Sonate pour violoncelle et piano en fa dièse mineur), and Charles Lecocq (Deux Pièces pour violoncelle et piano)
- String Quartet in D♭ major, Op. 16 (1897–98). Paris: Durand
- Allegro for horn and piano, Op. 18 (1905, Concours du Conservatoire). Paris.
- Introduction et marche for viola and piano, Op. 22 (published 1905)

Piano

- Thème et variations, Op. 5, Paris: Enoch. On YouTube by Cortot
- Impromptu in D♭ major, Op. 14, 1893
- Zacharie (d'après Michel-Ange), Op. 19
- Étude chromatique Op. 9, 1893. Paris: Enoch
- Morceau de lecture à vue for piano competition.
- Feuille d'Album, 1894, composed for Pierre Lafitte's journal Musica number 20. Paris: P. Lafitte, May 1904.
- Thème Varié, 1905. Paris: Alphonse Leduc. (Also in Musiciens français d'aujourd'hui mentioned above)

Vocal

- L'Attente (Marie de Moriana), 1895, for mezzo-soprano or baritone and piano, Op. 12. Orchestrated. Paris, Durand. (This poem was also set to music by Cesare Galeotti)
- Chemins d'Amour (Charles Fuster), Op. 13, 1896. Orchestrated. Paris, Rouart-Lerolle.

Transcriptions

- Bach, Prelude and Fugue in E minor transcribed for piano. Paris: Durand
- Louis-Albert Bourgault-Ducoudray: Rapsodie Cambodgienne, reduction for piano 4 hands. Paris: Heugel.
- Emmanuel Chabrier, España, transcription for piano, Paris: Enna (on YouTube by Ciccolini, Alexandre Tharaud or by Jean Doyen); España, reduction for two pianos 4 hands, Paris: Enoch (on YouTube). España (arranged for piano trio by Camille Chevillard and Olivier Kaspar) recorded by Trio Hoboken.
- Haendel : Célèbre Menuet, reduction for piano. Paris: Enoch. (Probably the Menuet from Suite in B-Flat Major, HWV 434)
- Rimsky-Korsakov : Sadko, Symphonic Poem arranged for piano 4 hands. Paris: Enoch.
- Richard Wagner, 'Scène du Venusberg' from Tannhaüser transcription for two pianos 8 hands. Paris: Durand. La Chevauchée des Valkyries (the Ride of the Valkyries), transcription for two pianos 8 hands. Mayence: Schott (on YouTube). 'Final scene' from Crépuscule des Dieux (Twilight of the Gods), transcription for two pianos 8 hands. Not published.

Orchestrations

- Schubert, 'Le Voyageur' ('Der Wanderer'). Not published.
- Schubert, 'Le Sosie' ('Der Doppelgänger'). Not published.
- Schumann, Op. 58, Esquisses. Paris, Durand

== Discography ==
- Sonate op. 8 by Jean-Jacques Kantorow, violin, and Alexandre Kantorow, piano. (Sonates françaises, CD NoMadMusic, 2014).
- España (arranged for piano trio by Camille Chevillard and Olivier Kaspar) recorded by Trio Hoboken.
- Thème et variations, Op. 5, Cortot
- España, transcription for piano, by Ciccolini, Alexandre Tharaud or Jean Doyen.

Cultural offices
Preceded by Charles Lamoureux	Principal Conductors, Lamoureux Orchestra; 1897–1923	Succeeded by Paul Paray
