= Canton of Faches-Thumesnil =

Coordinates: 50.60°N 3.07°E

The canton of Faches-Thumesnil is an administrative division of the Nord department, northern France. It was created at the French canton reorganisation which came into effect in March 2015. Its seat is in Faches-Thumesnil.

It consists of the following communes:

1. Chemy
2. Emmerin
3. Faches-Thumesnil
4. Gondecourt
5. Haubourdin
6. Herrin
7. Houplin-Ancoisne
8. Noyelles-lès-Seclin
9. Seclin
10. Templemars
11. Vendeville
12. Wattignies
