= Gondecourt =

- Commune
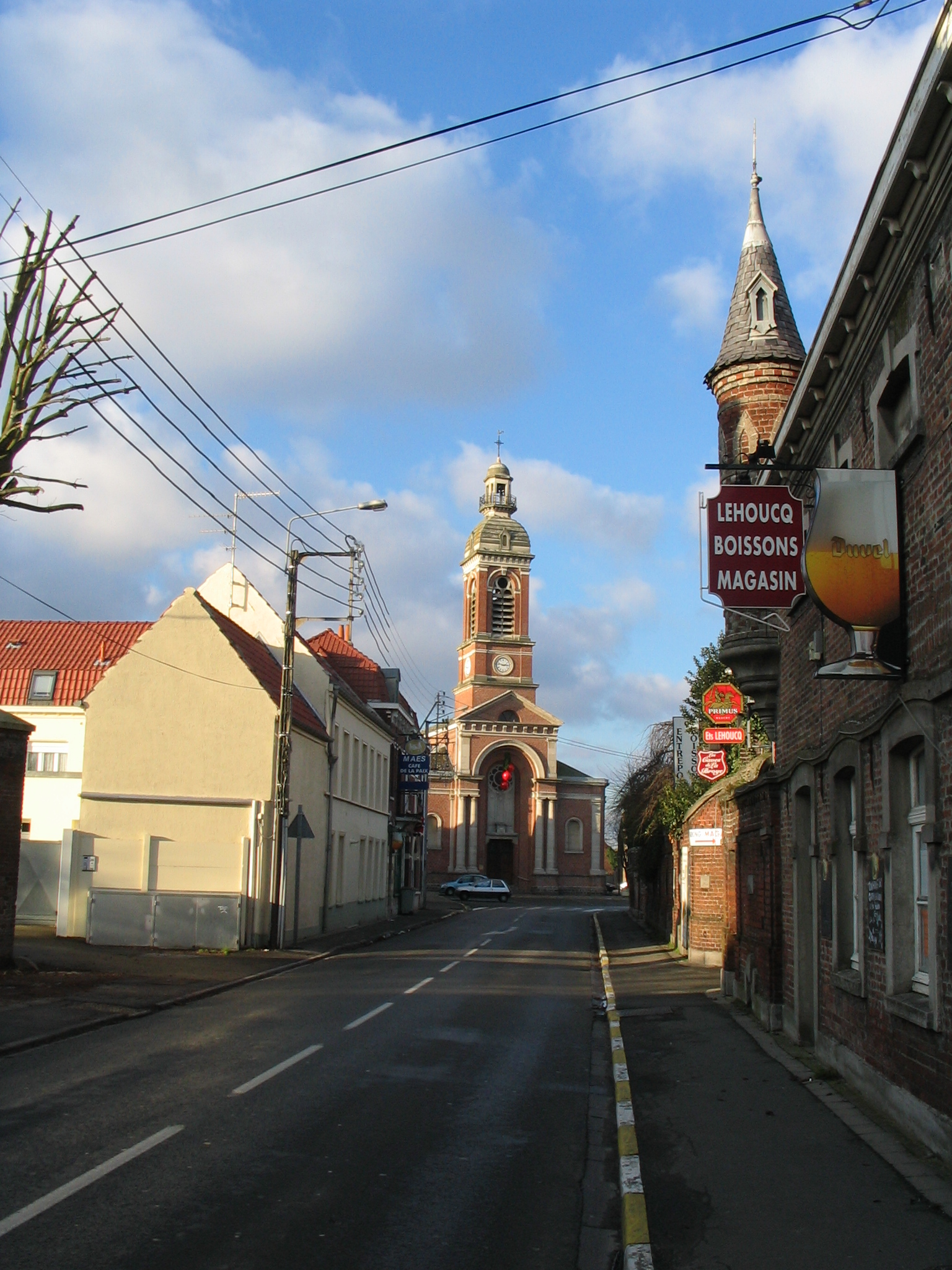
- A view within Gondecourt

- Coat of arms
- Location of Gondecourt
- Location within France Location within Hauts-de-France
- Coordinates: 50°32′43″N 2°59′05″E
- Country: France
- Region: Hauts-de-France
- Department: Nord
- Arrondissement: Lille
- Canton: Faches-Thumesnil
- Intercommunality: Pévèle-Carembault

Government
  - Mayor (2020–2026): Régis Bué
- Area^{1}: 8.22 km^{2} (3.17 sq mi)
- Elevation: 24 m (79 ft)
- Highest elevation: 31 m (102 ft)
- Lowest elevation: 19 m (62 ft)
- Population (2023): 4,148
  - Density: 505/km^{2} (1,310/sq mi)
- Time zone: UTC+01:00 (CET)
  - Summer (DST): UTC+02:00 (CEST)
- INSEE/Postal code: 59266 /59147
- ^{1} French Land Register data, which excludes lakes, ponds, glaciers > 1 km^{2} (0.386 sq mi or 247 acres) and river estuaries.

Gondecourt (French pronunciation: [ɡɔ̃dkuʁ]) is a commune in the Nord department in northern France.

== Population ==
Historical population
Year	Pop.	±% p.a.
1968	2,600	—
1975	2,800	+1.06%
1982	3,410	+2.86%
1990	3,777	+1.29%
1999	3,902	+0.36%
2007	3,947	+0.14%
2012	3,918	−0.15%
2017	4,055	+0.69%
2023	4,148	+0.38%
Source: INSEE

== Heraldry ==
Arms of Gondecourt	The arms of Gondecourt are blazoned : Argent, on a cross gules, 5 escallops argent.

== See also ==
- Communes of the Nord department
