= La Longueville =

- Commune
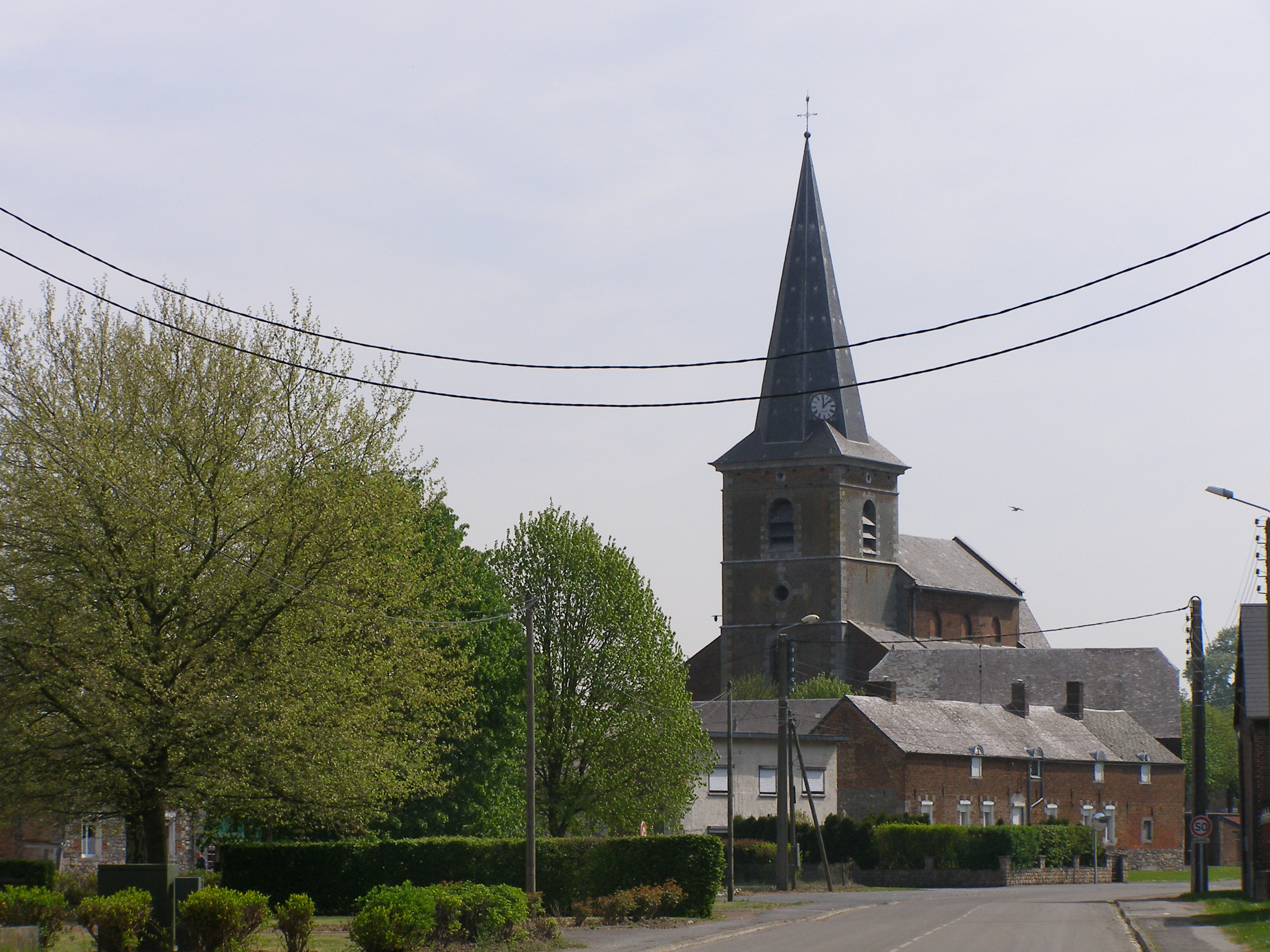
- The church in La Longueville

- Coat of arms
- Location of La Longueville
- Location within France Location within Hauts-de-France
- Coordinates: 50°17′23″N 3°51′28″E
- Country: France
- Region: Hauts-de-France
- Department: Nord
- Arrondissement: Avesnes-sur-Helpe
- Canton: Aulnoye-Aymeries
- Intercommunality: CC Pays de Mormal

Government
  - Mayor (2020–2026): Stéphane Latouche
- Area^{1}: 17.64 km^{2} (6.81 sq mi)
- Elevation: 146 m (479 ft)
- Highest elevation: 161 m (528 ft)
- Lowest elevation: 134 m (440 ft)
- Population (2023): 2,057
  - Density: 116.6/km^{2} (302.0/sq mi)
- Time zone: UTC+01:00 (CET)
  - Summer (DST): UTC+02:00 (CEST)
- INSEE/Postal code: 59357 /59570
- ^{1} French Land Register data, which excludes lakes, ponds, glaciers > 1 km^{2} (0.386 sq mi or 247 acres) and river estuaries.

La Longueville (French pronunciation: [la lɔ̃ɡvil]) is a commune in the Nord department in northern France.

== Population ==
Historical population
Year	Pop.	±% p.a.
1968	1,760	—
1975	1,759	−0.01%
1982	1,844	+0.68%
1990	2,154	+1.96%
1999	2,196	+0.21%
2007	2,224	+0.16%
2012	2,138	−0.79%
2017	2,097	−0.39%
2023	2,057	−0.32%
Source: INSEE

== Heraldry ==
Arms of La Longueville	The arms of La Longueville are blazoned : Azure, billetty, a lion argent, armed and langued gules. (La Longueville, Templemars, and Verchain-Maugré use the same arms.)

== See also ==
- Communes of the Nord department
