= Houplin-Ancoisne =

- Commune
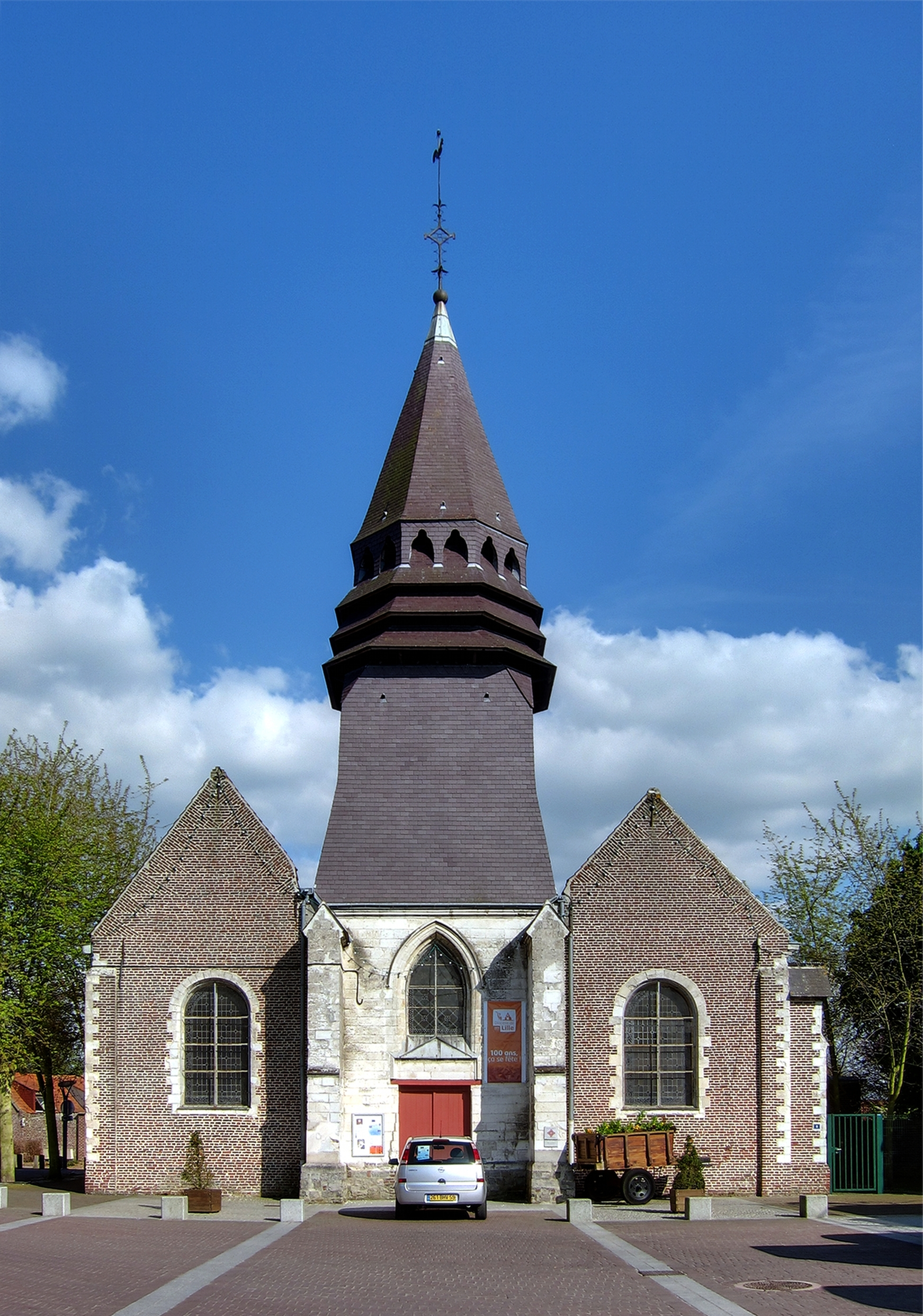
- The church in Houplin-Ancoisne

- Coat of arms
- Location of Houplin-Ancoisne
- Location within France Location within Hauts-de-France
- Coordinates: 50°33′50″N 3°00′09″E
- Country: France
- Region: Hauts-de-France
- Department: Nord
- Arrondissement: Lille
- Canton: Faches-Thumesnil
- Intercommunality: Métropole Européenne de Lille

Government
  - Mayor (2020–2026): Dominique Gantiez
- Area^{1}: 6.48 km^{2} (2.50 sq mi)
- Elevation: 26 m (85 ft)
- Highest elevation: 33 m (108 ft)
- Lowest elevation: 17 m (56 ft)
- Population (2023): 3,326
  - Density: 513/km^{2} (1,330/sq mi)
- Time zone: UTC+01:00 (CET)
  - Summer (DST): UTC+02:00 (CEST)
- INSEE/Postal code: 59316 /59263
- ^{1} French Land Register data, which excludes lakes, ponds, glaciers > 1 km^{2} (0.386 sq mi or 247 acres) and river estuaries.

Houplin-Ancoisne (French pronunciation: [uplɛ̃ ɑ̃kwan]) is a commune in the Nord department in northern France.

Until 1959, it was known as Houplin-Lez-Seclin.

== Population ==
Historical population
Year	Pop.	±% p.a.
1968	2,370	—
1975	2,653	+1.62%
1982	3,009	+1.82%
1990	3,407	+1.56%
1999	3,631	+0.71%
2007	3,501	−0.45%
2012	3,464	−0.21%
2017	3,409	−0.32%
2023	3,326	−0.41%
Source: INSEE

== Heraldry ==
Arms of Houplin-Ancoisne	The arms of Houplin-Ancoisne are blazoned : Azure, a chevron between 3 cross crosslets fitchy Or.

== See also ==
- Communes of the Nord department
