= Mérignies =

- Commune
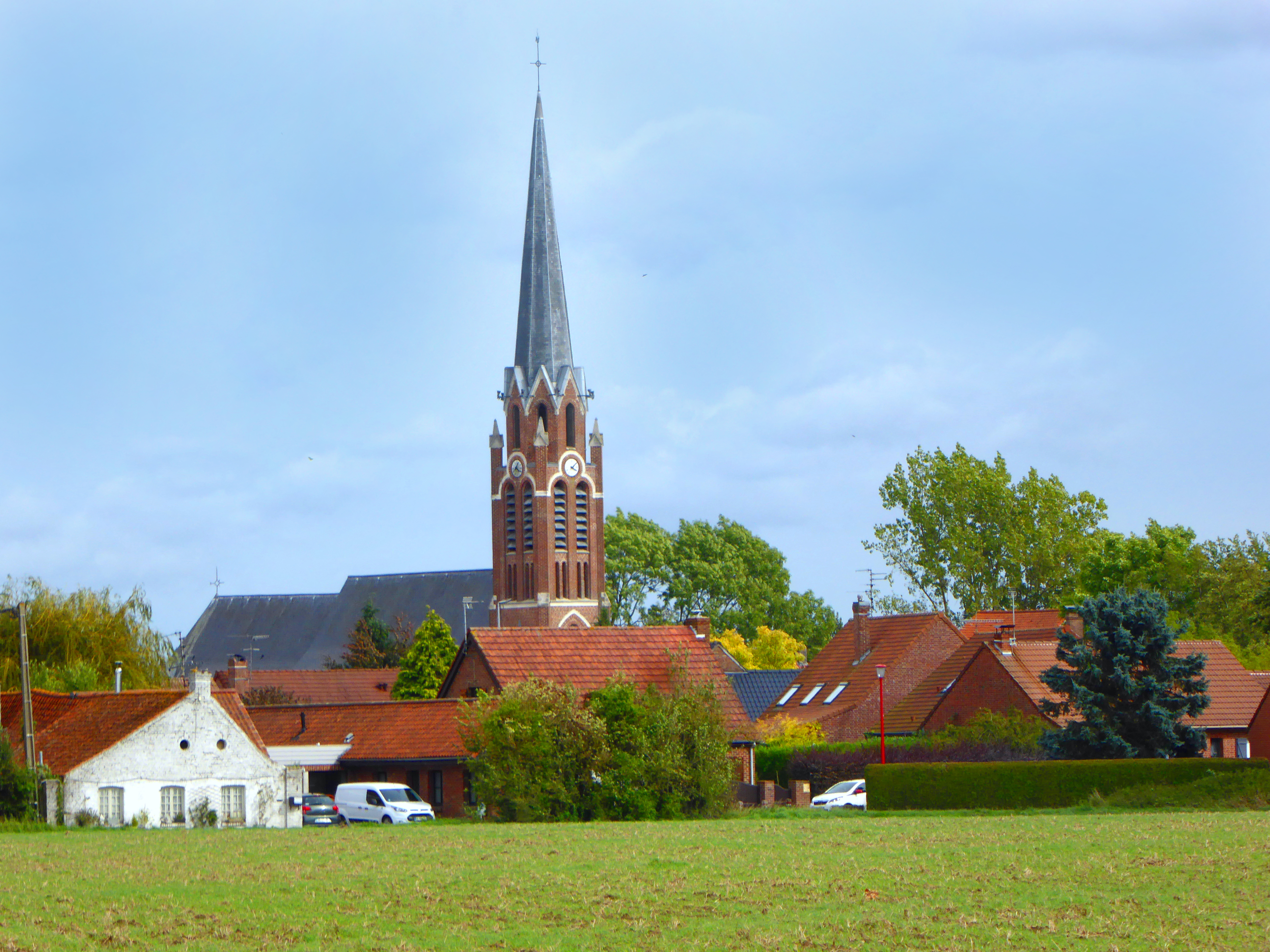
- The church in Mérignies

- Coat of arms
- Location of Mérignies
- Location within France Location within Hauts-de-France
- Coordinates: 50°30′23″N 3°06′39″E
- Country: France
- Region: Hauts-de-France
- Department: Nord
- Arrondissement: Lille
- Canton: Templeuve-en-Pévèle
- Intercommunality: CC Pévèle-Carembault

Government
  - Mayor (2020–2026): Paul Dhallewyn
- Area^{1}: 8.61 km^{2} (3.32 sq mi)
- Elevation: 39 m (128 ft)
- Highest elevation: 56 m (184 ft)
- Lowest elevation: 32 m (105 ft)
- Population (2023): 3,527
  - Density: 410/km^{2} (1,060/sq mi)
- Time zone: UTC+01:00 (CET)
  - Summer (DST): UTC+02:00 (CEST)
- INSEE/Postal code: 59398 /59710
- ^{1} French Land Register data, which excludes lakes, ponds, glaciers > 1 km^{2} (0.386 sq mi or 247 acres) and river estuaries.

Mérignies (French pronunciation: [meʁiɲi]) is a commune in the Nord department of the Hauts-de-France region of northern France. The village is situated around 19 kilometres outside of the city of Lille.

== Population ==
Historical population
Year	Pop.	±% p.a.
1968	869	—
1975	1,077	+3.11%
1982	1,462	+4.46%
1990	1,724	+2.08%
1999	2,055	+1.97%
2007	2,269	+1.25%
2012	2,632	+3.01%
2017	3,065	+3.09%
2023	3,527	+2.37%
Source: INSEE

== Heraldry ==
Arms of Mérignies	The arms of Mérignies are blazoned : Plumetty Or and sable. (Mérignies and Vendeville use the same arms.)

== Twinning ==
- Kilmacolm, Scotland, United Kingdom (Since 2014, concluding with visits by delegations from both settlements)

== See also ==
- Communes of the Nord department
