= Haubourdin =

- Commune
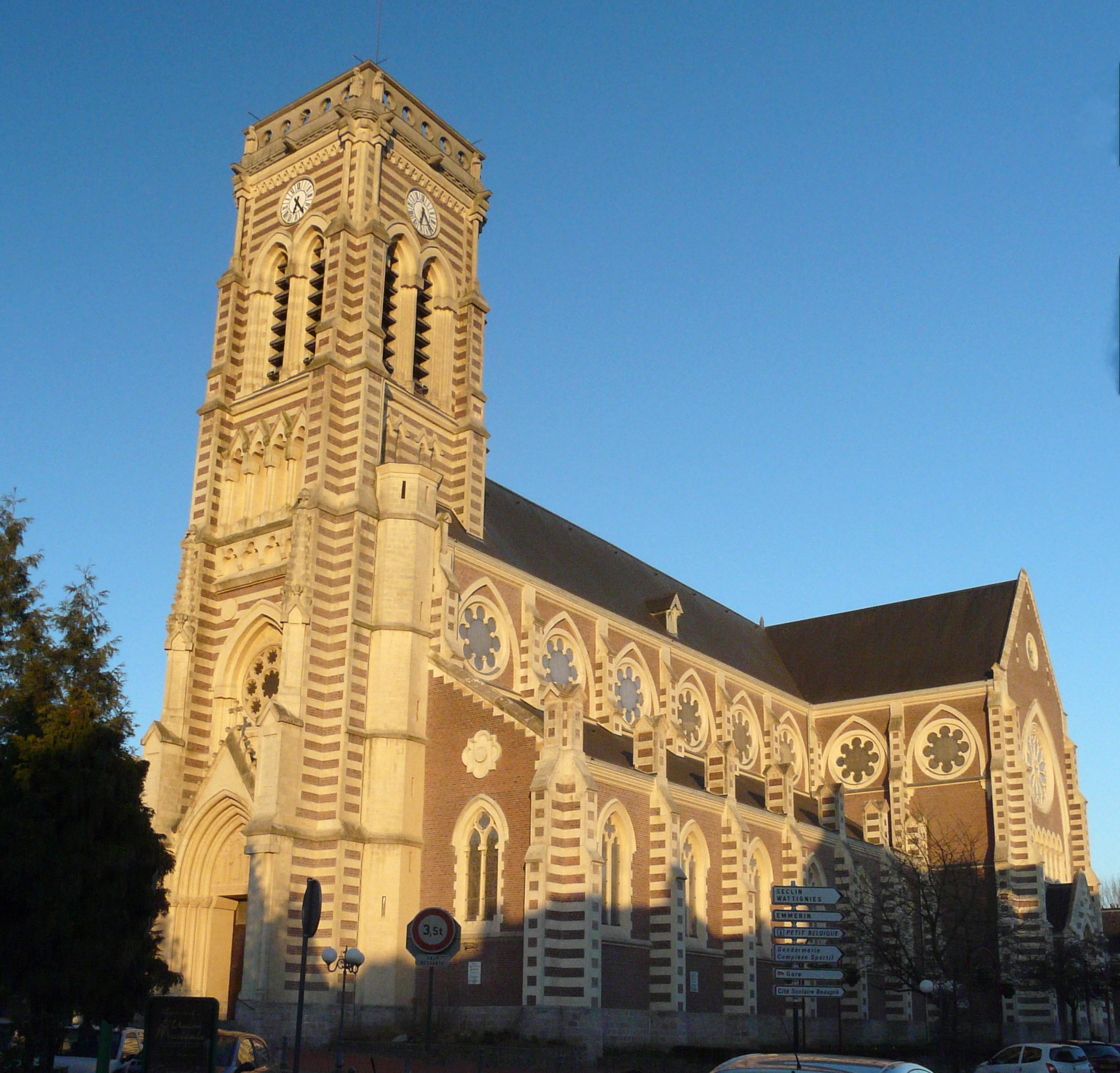
- The church in Haubourdin

- Coat of arms
- Location of Haubourdin
- Location within France Location within Hauts-de-France
- Coordinates: 50°36′35″N 2°59′16″E
- Country: France
- Region: Hauts-de-France
- Department: Nord
- Arrondissement: Lille
- Canton: Faches-Thumesnil
- Intercommunality: Métropole Européenne de Lille

Government
  - Mayor (2020–2026): Pierre Beharelle
- Area^{1}: 5.31 km^{2} (2.05 sq mi)
- Elevation: 23 m (75 ft)
- Highest elevation: 35 m (115 ft)
- Lowest elevation: 17 m (56 ft)
- Population (2023): 15,074
  - Density: 2,840/km^{2} (7,350/sq mi)
- Time zone: UTC+01:00 (CET)
  - Summer (DST): UTC+02:00 (CEST)
- INSEE/Postal code: 59286 /59320
- ^{1} French Land Register data, which excludes lakes, ponds, glaciers > 1 km^{2} (0.386 sq mi or 247 acres) and river estuaries.

Haubourdin (French pronunciation: [obuʁdɛ̃]) is a commune in the Nord department in northern France. It is part of the Métropole Européenne de Lille.

== Population ==
Historical population
Year	Pop.	±% p.a.
1968	12,106	—
1975	14,552	+2.66%
1982	14,497	−0.05%
1990	14,321	−0.15%
1999	14,965	+0.49%
2007	14,726	−0.20%
2012	14,498	−0.31%
2017	14,936	+0.60%
2023	15,074	+0.15%
Source: INSEE

== Heraldry ==
Arms of Haubourdin	The arms of Haubourdin are blazoned : Gules, a lion Or, armed, langued and crowned azure. (Aix-en-Pévèle, Emmerin, and Haubourdin use the same arms.)

== See also ==
- Communes of the Nord department
