= Kaja (newspaper) =

Estonian newspaper

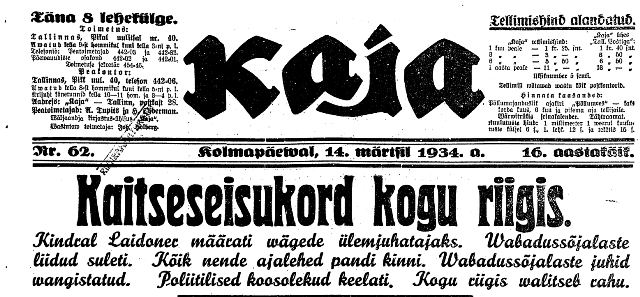
- Front page in March 1934
- Type: Daily
- Founded: 1919
- Ceased publication: 1935
- Political alignment: Conservatism; Agrarianism
- Language: Estonian
- Circulation: Pikk tänav, Tallinn

Kaja ('Echo') was a daily newspaper published in Tallinn, Estonia between 1919 and 1935, first as the official newspaper of the Estonian Rural League and later as the voice of the Farmers' Assemblies.

The chief editors were Jüri Uluots, Kaarel Eenpalu, Johan Holberg, Ants Oidermaa and Artur Tupits.

In 1935, Kaja was superseded by the pro-government newspaper Uus Eesti.
