= Faches-Thumesnil =

- Commune
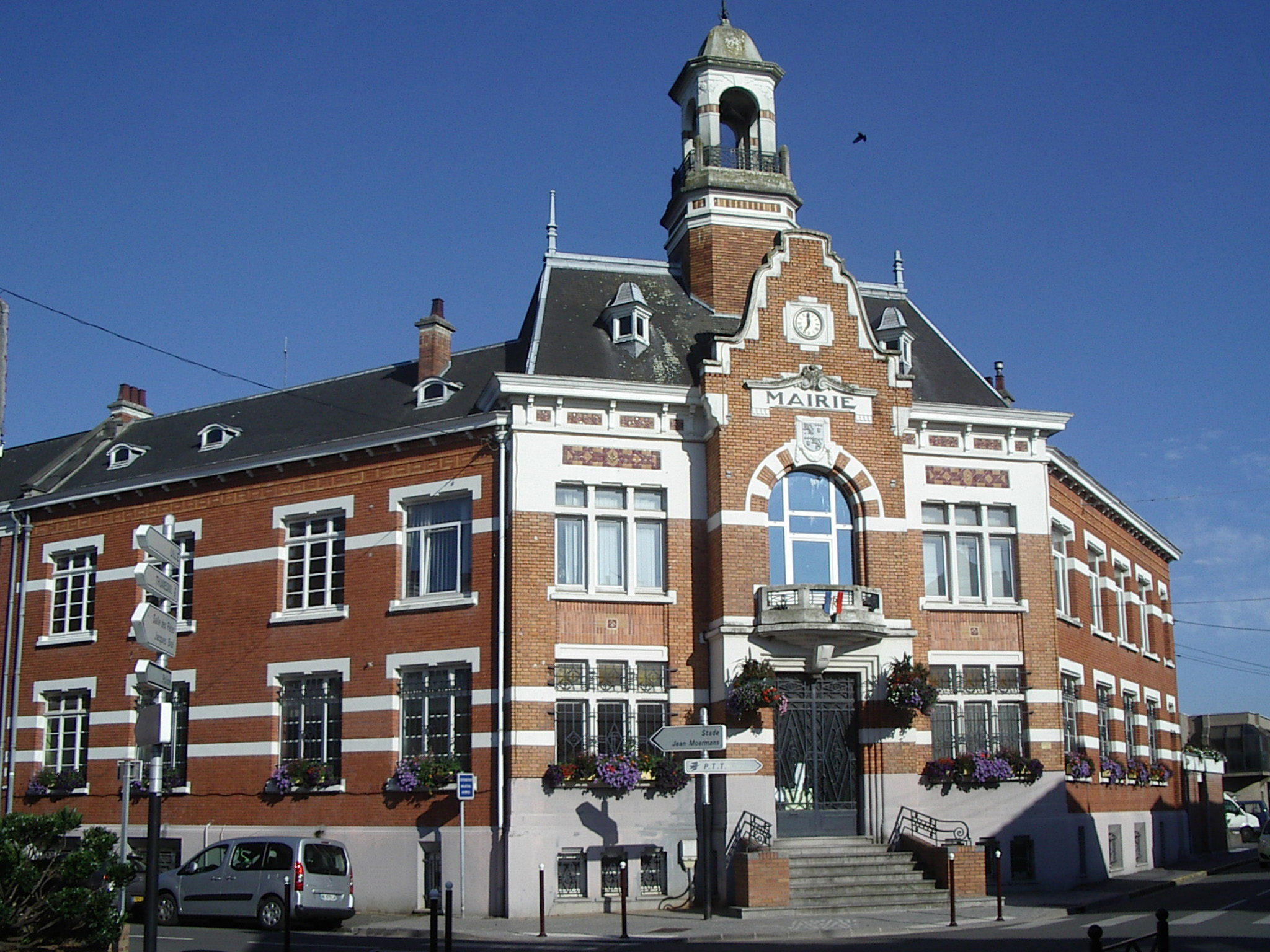
- The town hall in Faches-Thumesnil

- Coat of arms
- Location of Faches-Thumesnil
- Location within France Location within Hauts-de-France
- Coordinates: 50°35′58″N 3°04′28″E
- Country: France
- Region: Hauts-de-France
- Department: Nord
- Arrondissement: Lille
- Canton: Faches-Thumesnil
- Intercommunality: Métropole Européenne de Lille

Government
  - Mayor (2020–2026): Patrick Proisy
- Area^{1}: 4.62 km^{2} (1.78 sq mi)
- Elevation: 43 m (141 ft)
- Highest elevation: 58 m (190 ft)
- Lowest elevation: 30 m (98 ft)
- Population (2023): 18,619
  - Density: 4,030/km^{2} (10,400/sq mi)
- Time zone: UTC+01:00 (CET)
  - Summer (DST): UTC+02:00 (CEST)
- INSEE/Postal code: 59220 /59155
- ^{1} French Land Register data, which excludes lakes, ponds, glaciers > 1 km^{2} (0.386 sq mi or 247 acres) and river estuaries.

Faches-Thumesnil (French pronunciation: [faʃ tymenil]) is a commune in the Nord department in northern France.

It is a suburb south of Lille and forms part of the Métropole Européenne de Lille.

== Population ==
Historical population
| Year | Pop. | ±% p.a. |
|---|---|---|
| 1968 | 16,801 | — |
| 1975 | 18,645 | +1.50% |
| 1982 | 16,931 | −1.37% |
| 1990 | 15,774 | −0.88% |
| 1999 | 15,902 | +0.09% |
| 2007 | 16,680 | +0.60% |
| 2012 | 17,476 | +0.94% |
| 2017 | 17,835 | +0.41% |
| 2023 | 18,619 | +0.72% |
Source: INSEE

== Heraldry ==
| Arms of Faches-Thumesnil | The arms of Faches-Thumesnil are blazoned : Quarterly 1&4: Sable, 6 bezants, overall a lion Or, armed and langued gules (derived from Faches); 2&3 Azure, an inescutcheon argent and in chief 3 mullets of 5 Or(Thumesnil). (Faches' original arms were bezanty, not 6 bezants. # reduced in the quartering.) |

Faches Thumesnil is twinned with the market town of St.Neots in Cambridgeshire, England, and with the town of Naousa, Greece.

== See also ==
- Communes of the Nord department
