= Uus Eesti =

Estonian newspaper

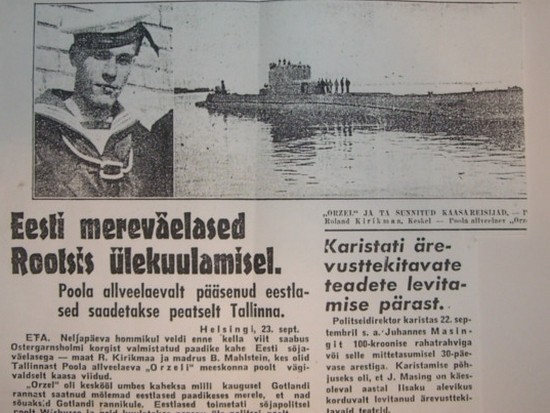
- The Orzeł incident, as covered by Uus Esti
- Type: Daily
- Editor-in-chief: Artur Tupits (1935–1937); Ants Oidermaa (1937–1939)
- Editor: Hugo Kukk
- Founded: 1935
- Ceased publication: 21 June 1940
- Political alignment: pro-government
- Language: Estonian
- Headquarters: Tallinn u
- Circulation: 22,000–26,000
- Sister newspapers: Uus Eesti kalender (1935–1939); Hommikune Uus Eesti (1938)

Uus Eesti (New Estonia) was a daily newspaper published in Estonia from September 1935 until the Soviet occupation of Estonia in June 1940. The newspaper was politically aligned with the Estonian government.

== History ==
The paper was established in September 1935 as the successor to the paper Kaja.

Columnists and regular contributors of Uus Eesti included Johannes Aavik, Paul Öpik, Friedebert Tuglas, Aleksander Tõnisson, Marie Under, August Gailit, Paul Kogerman, Mait Metsanurk, Henrik Visnapuu, and others.

In 1937, the National Archives of Estonia made an agreement with Uus Eesti photographer A. Kalm to share one photograph of each major public event in Estonia, as part of a larger project to preserve photographs from national newspapers.

The Soviets shut the paper down on 21 June 1940. The pro-Soviet, communist newspaper Rahva Hääl was printed in its place.
