= Emmerin =

- Commune
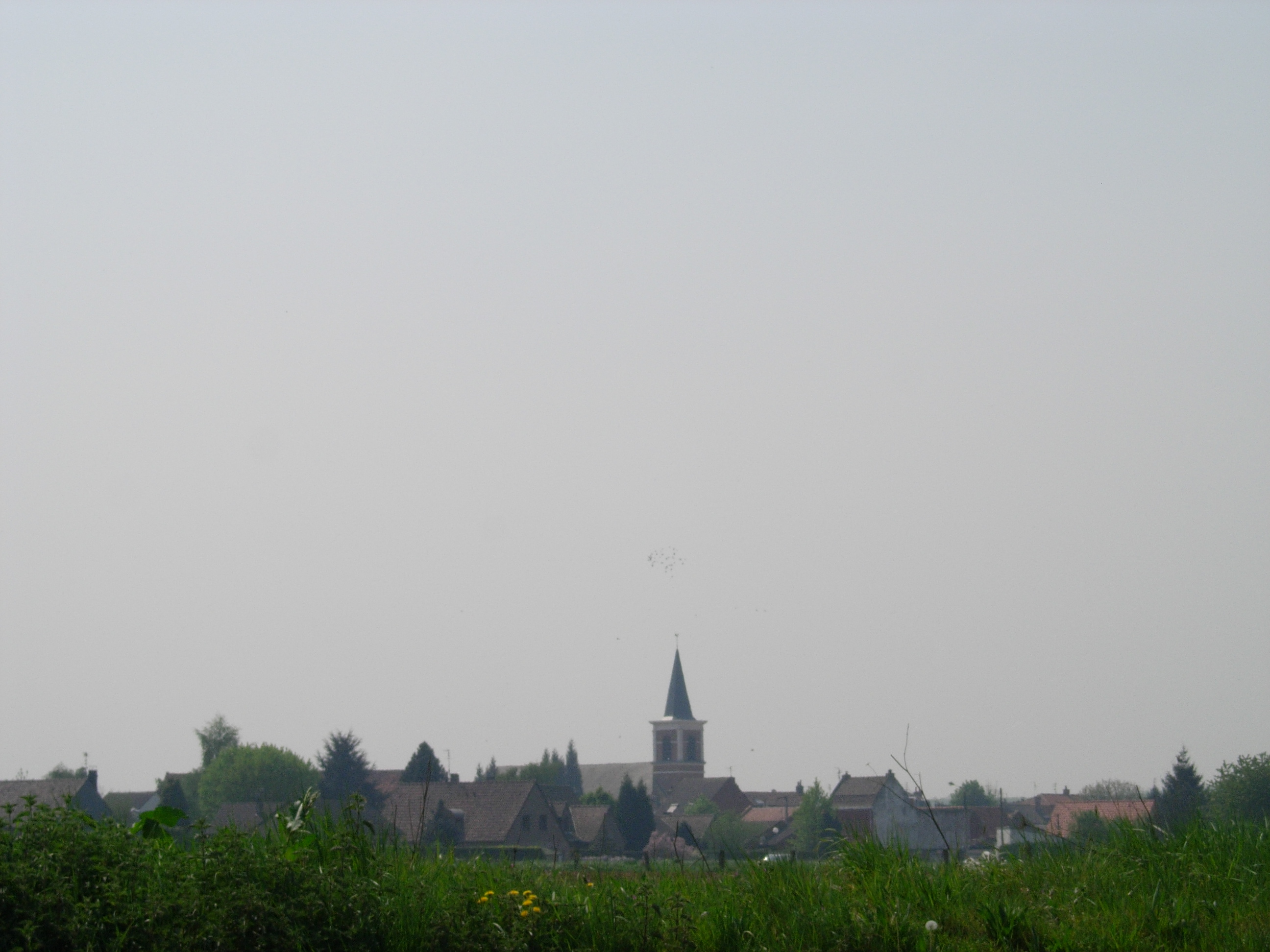
- A general view of Emmerin

- Coat of arms
- Location of Emmerin
- Location within France Location within Hauts-de-France
- Coordinates: 50°35′39″N 3°00′09″E
- Country: France
- Region: Hauts-de-France
- Department: Nord
- Arrondissement: Lille
- Canton: Faches-Thumesnil
- Intercommunality: Métropole Européenne de Lille

Government
  - Mayor (2020–2026): Danièle Ponchaux
- Area^{1}: 4.91 km^{2} (1.90 sq mi)
- Elevation: 22 m (72 ft)
- Highest elevation: 41 m (135 ft)
- Lowest elevation: 17 m (56 ft)
- Population (2023): 3,026
  - Density: 616/km^{2} (1,600/sq mi)
- Time zone: UTC+01:00 (CET)
  - Summer (DST): UTC+02:00 (CEST)
- INSEE/Postal code: 59193 /59320
- ^{1} French Land Register data, which excludes lakes, ponds, glaciers > 1 km^{2} (0.386 sq mi or 247 acres) and river estuaries.

Emmerin (French pronunciation: [ɛmʁɛ̃]) is a commune in the Nord department in northern France. It is part of the Métropole Européenne de Lille.

== Population ==
Historical population
Year	Pop.	±% p.a.
1968	2,109	—
1975	2,313	+1.33%
1982	2,411	+0.59%
1990	2,997	+2.76%
1999	3,029	+0.12%
2007	3,030	+0.00%
2012	3,210	+1.16%
2017	3,172	−0.24%
2023	3,026	−0.78%
Source: INSEE

== Heraldry ==
Arms of Emmerin	The arms of Emmerin are blazoned : Gules, a lion Or, armed, langued and crowned azure. (Aix-en-Pévèle, Emmerin, and Haubourdin use the same arms.)

== See also ==
- Communes of the Nord department
