= Noyelles-lès-Seclin =

- Commune
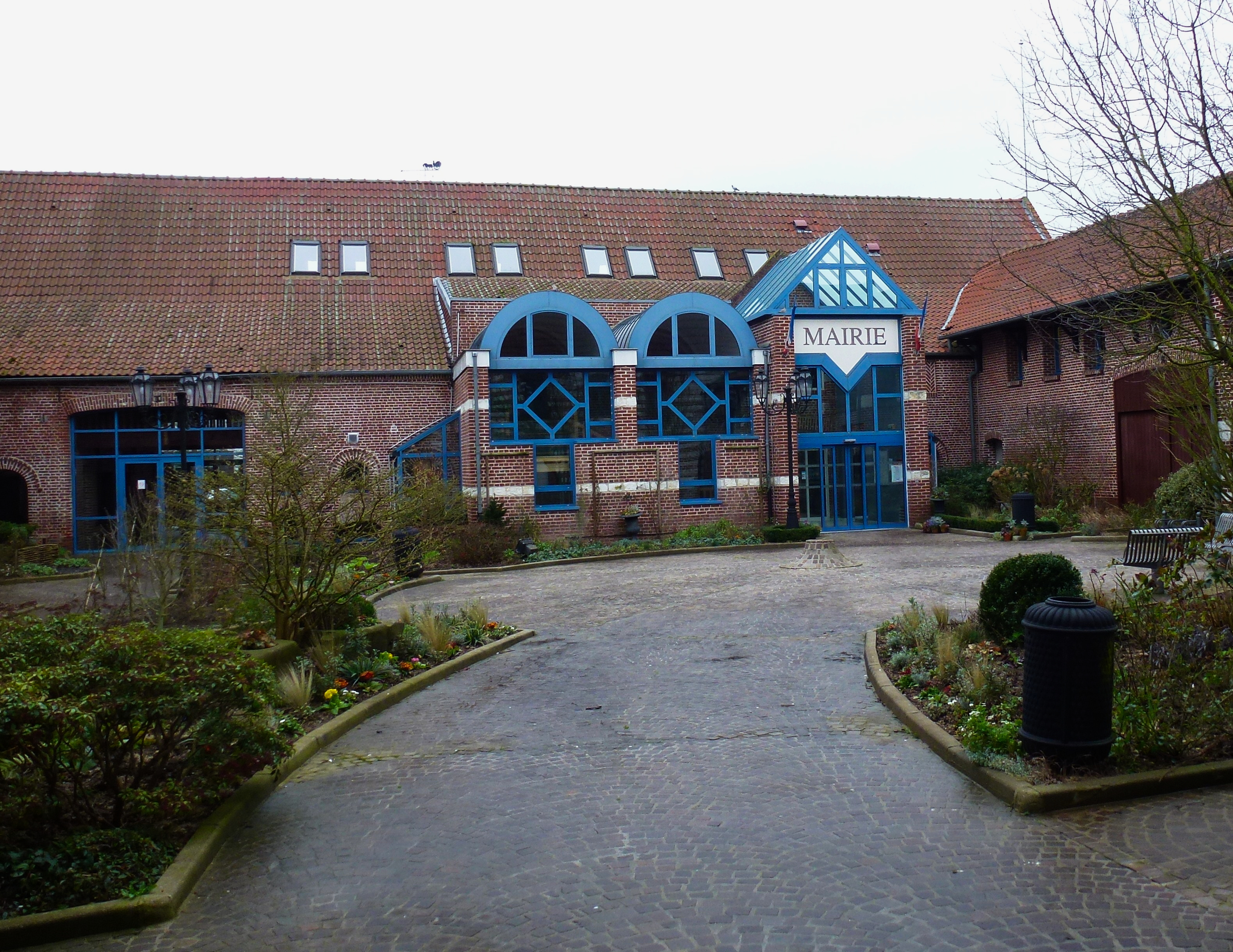
- The town hall in Noyelles-lès-Seclin

- Coat of arms
- Location of Noyelles-lès-Seclin
- Location within France Location within Hauts-de-France
- Coordinates: 50°34′38″N 3°01′04″E
- Country: France
- Region: Hauts-de-France
- Department: Nord
- Arrondissement: Lille
- Canton: Faches-Thumesnil
- Intercommunality: Métropole Européenne de Lille

Government
  - Mayor (2020–2026): Henri Lenfant
- Area^{1}: 2.38 km^{2} (0.92 sq mi)
- Elevation: 23 m (75 ft)
- Highest elevation: 37 m (121 ft)
- Lowest elevation: 18 m (59 ft)
- Population (2023): 838
  - Density: 352/km^{2} (912/sq mi)
- Time zone: UTC+01:00 (CET)
  - Summer (DST): UTC+02:00 (CEST)
- INSEE/Postal code: 59437 /59139
- ^{1} French Land Register data, which excludes lakes, ponds, glaciers > 1 km^{2} (0.386 sq mi or 247 acres) and river estuaries.

Noyelles-lès-Seclin (French pronunciation: [nwajɛl lɛ səklɛ̃], literally Noyelles near Seclin) is a commune in the Nord department in northern France. It is part of the Métropole Européenne de Lille.

== Heraldry ==
| Arms of Noyelles-lès-Seclin | The arms of Noyelles-lès-Seclin are blazoned : Argent a chevron gules, between 2 martlets sable and a trefoil vert. |

== See also ==
- Communes of the Nord department
