= Aix-en-Pévèle =

- Commune
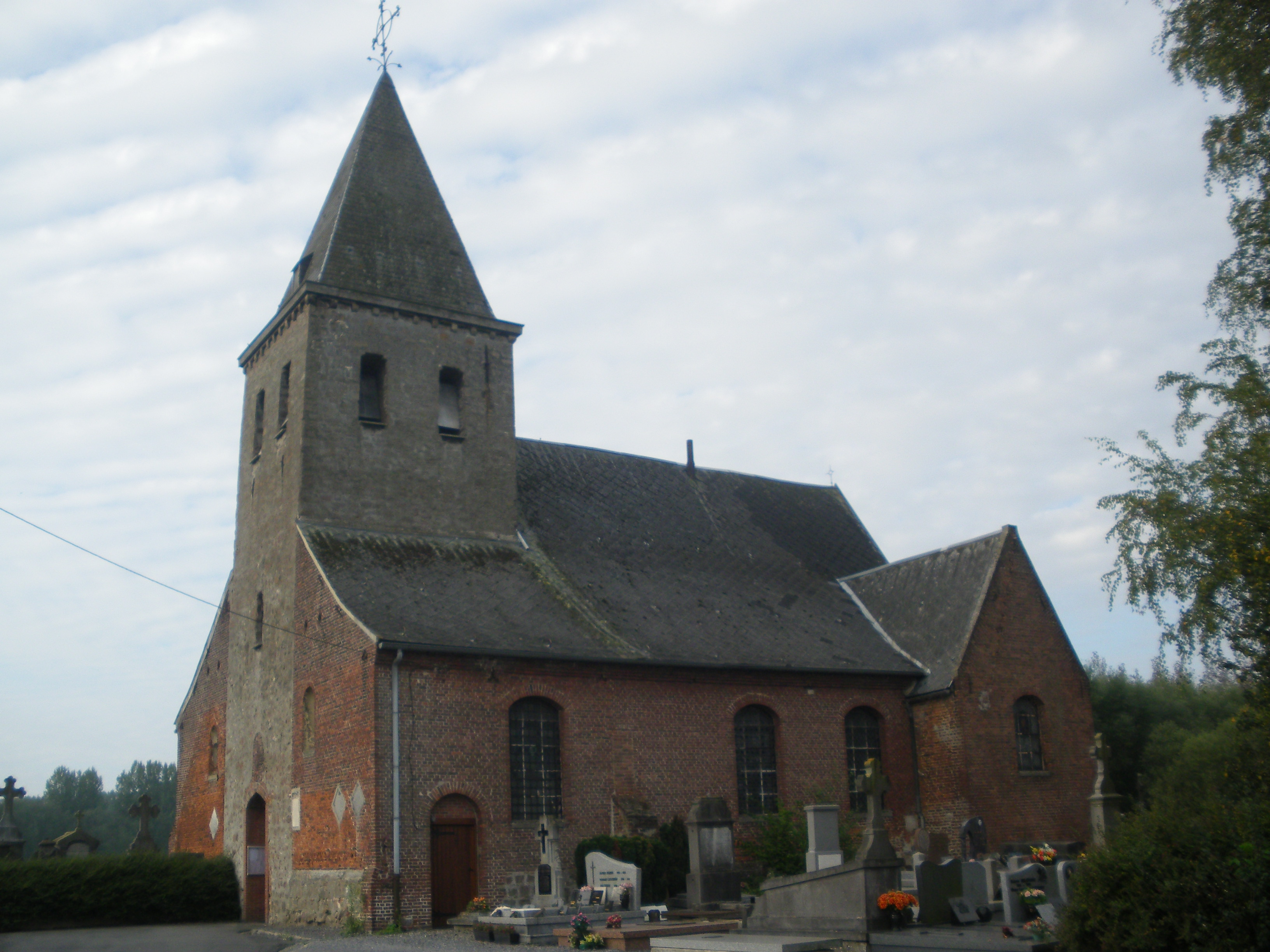
- The church in Aix

- Coat of arms
- Location of Aix-en-Pévèle
- Location within France Location within Hauts-de-France
- Coordinates: 50°29′27″N 3°17′29″E
- Country: France
- Region: Hauts-de-France
- Department: Nord
- Arrondissement: Douai
- Canton: Orchies
- Intercommunality: Pévèle Carembault

Government
  - Mayor (2020–2026): Didier Dalloy
- Area^{1}: 6.55 km^{2} (2.53 sq mi)
- Elevation: 38 m (125 ft)
- Highest elevation: 47 m (154 ft)
- Lowest elevation: 22 m (72 ft)
- Population (2023): 1,338
  - Density: 204/km^{2} (529/sq mi)
- Time zone: UTC+01:00 (CET)
  - Summer (DST): UTC+02:00 (CEST)
- INSEE/Postal code: 59004 /59310
- ^{1} French Land Register data, which excludes lakes, ponds, glaciers > 1 km^{2} (0.386 sq mi or 247 acres) and river estuaries.

Aix-en-Pévèle (French pronunciation: [ɛks ɑ̃ pevɛl]), before 2018 just Aix, is a commune in the Nord department in northern France.

It is 20 km (12 mi) southeast of Lille.

== Population ==
Historical population
Year	Pop.	±% p.a.
1968	579	—
1975	644	+1.53%
1982	690	+0.99%
1990	777	+1.50%
1999	933	+2.05%
2007	1,060	+1.61%
2012	1,124	+1.18%
2017	1,220	+1.65%
2023	1,338	+1.55%
Source: INSEE

== Heraldry ==
Arms of Aix	The arms of Aix are blazoned : Gules, a lion Or, armed, langued and crowned azure. (Aix-en-Pévèle, Emmerin, and Haubourdin use the same arms.)

== See also ==
- Communes of the Nord department
