= Vanamõisa, Lääne-Viru County =

Village in Estonia

Coordinates: 59°26′47″N 26°11′52″E

Vanamõisa
- Village
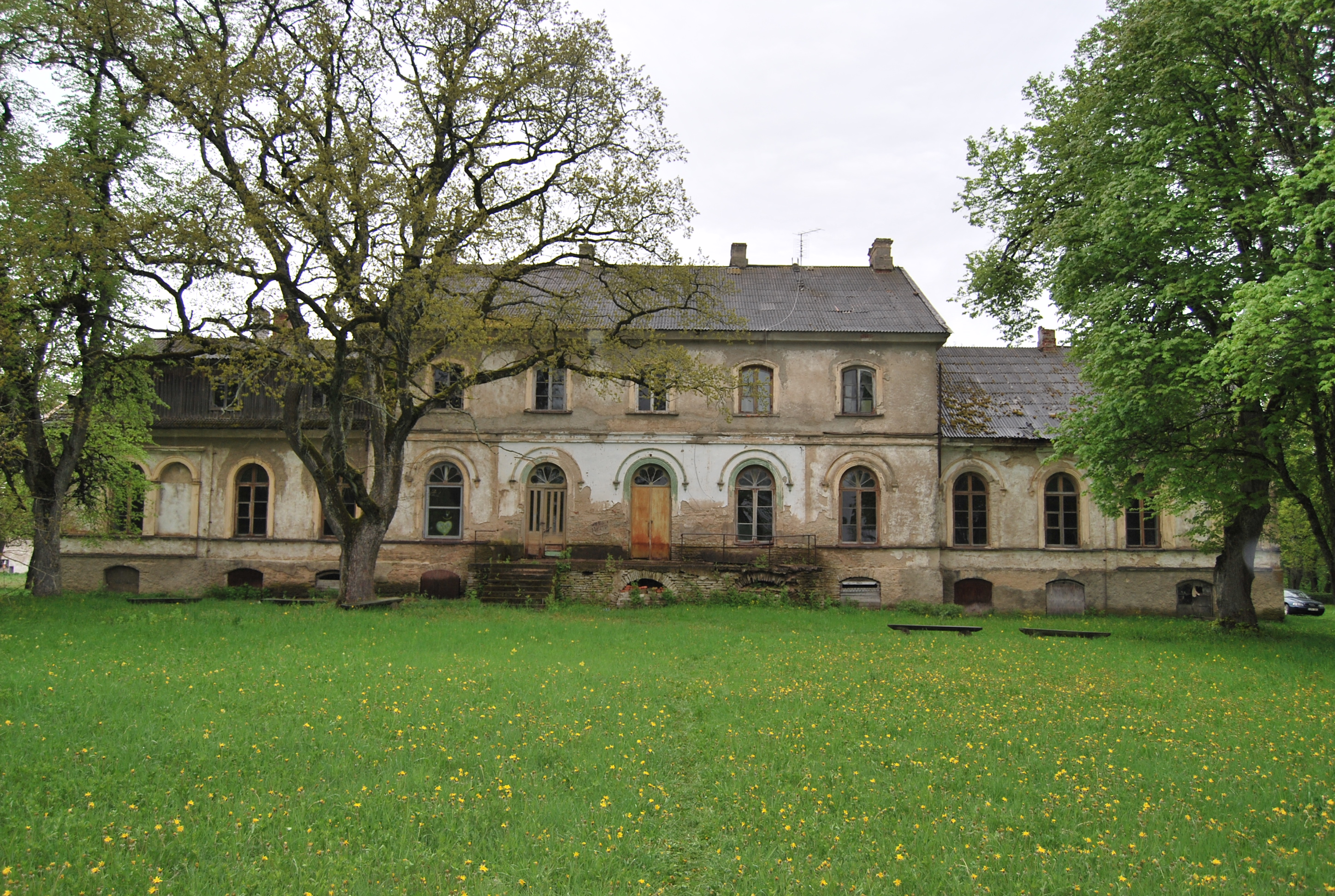
- Vanamõisa Manor
- Interactive map of Vanamõisa
- Country: Estonia
- County: Lääne-Viru County
- Parish: Haljala Parish

Ethnicity
  - Estonians: 94.1%
  - other: 5.9%

Gender
  - Female: 56.9%
  - Male: 43.1%
- Time zone: UTC+2 (EET)
  - Summer (DST): UTC+3 (EEST)

Vanamõisa (German: Altenhof) is a village in Haljala Parish, Lääne-Viru County, in northeastern Estonia. It has a population of 51 (as of 31 January 2011).
