= Templemars =

- Commune
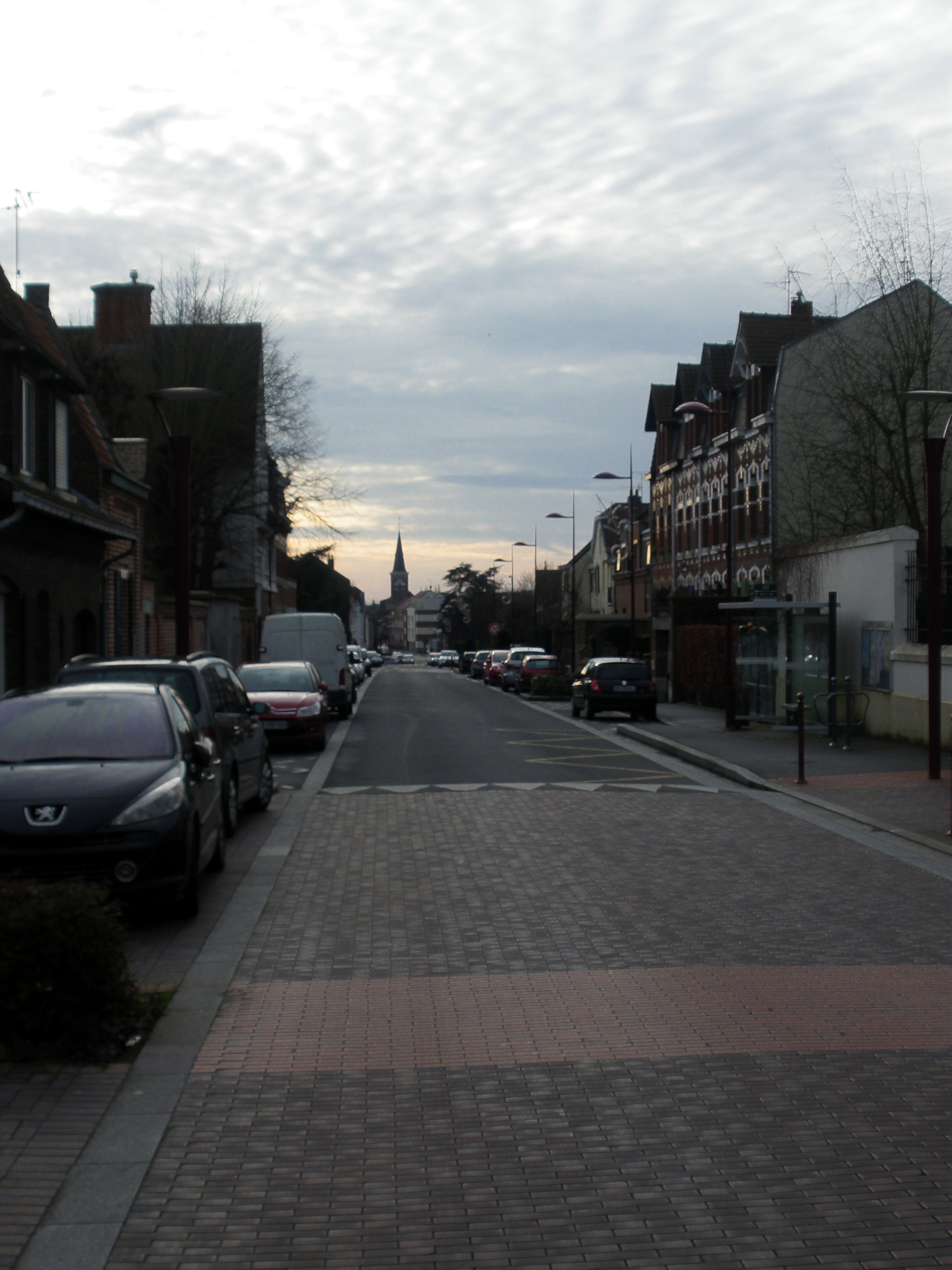
- A view within Templemars

- Coat of arms
- Location of Templemars
- Location within France Location within Hauts-de-France
- Coordinates: 50°34′29″N 3°03′18″E
- Country: France
- Region: Hauts-de-France
- Department: Nord
- Arrondissement: Lille
- Canton: Faches-Thumesnil
- Intercommunality: Métropole Européenne de Lille

Government
  - Mayor (2020–2026): Pierre-Henri Desmettre
- Area^{1}: 4.61 km^{2} (1.78 sq mi)
- Elevation: 34 m (112 ft)
- Highest elevation: 47 m (154 ft)
- Lowest elevation: 28 m (92 ft)
- Population (2023): 3,669
  - Density: 796/km^{2} (2,060/sq mi)
- Time zone: UTC+01:00 (CET)
  - Summer (DST): UTC+02:00 (CEST)
- INSEE/Postal code: 59585 /59175
- Website: www.templemars.fr
- ^{1} French Land Register data, which excludes lakes, ponds, glaciers > 1 km^{2} (0.386 sq mi or 247 acres) and river estuaries.

Templemars (French pronunciation: [tɑ̃pləmaʁ]) is a commune in the Nord department in northern France. It is part of the Métropole Européenne de Lille. The commune has the head office of Castorama.

== Population ==
Historical population
Year	Pop.	±% p.a.
1968	2,619	—
1975	2,693	+0.40%
1982	3,052	+1.80%
1990	3,359	+1.21%
1999	3,435	+0.25%
2007	3,349	−0.32%
2012	3,170	−1.09%
2017	3,344	+1.07%
2023	3,669	+1.56%
Source: INSEE

== Heraldry ==
Arms of Templemars	The arms of Templemars are blazoned : Azure, billetty, a lion argent, armed and langued gules. (La Longueville, Templemars, and Verchain-Maugré use the same arms.)

== See also ==
- Communes of the Nord department
