= Vendeville =

- Commune
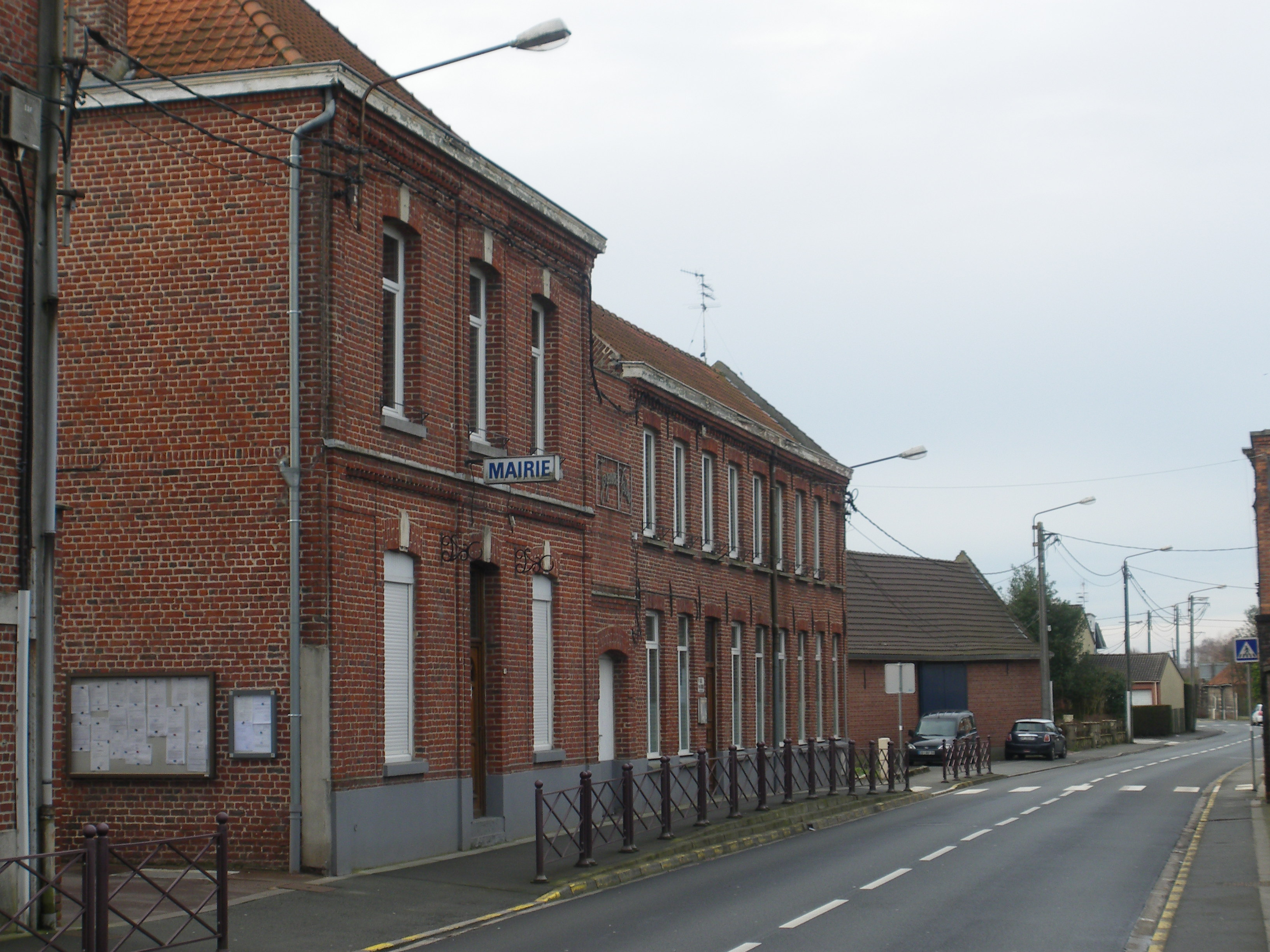
- The town hall in Vendeville

- Coat of arms
- Location of Vendeville
- Location within France Location within Hauts-de-France
- Coordinates: 50°34′34″N 3°04′45″E
- Country: France
- Region: Hauts-de-France
- Department: Nord
- Arrondissement: Lille
- Canton: Faches-Thumesnil
- Intercommunality: Métropole Européenne de Lille

Government
  - Mayor (2020–2026): Ludovic Proisy
- Area^{1}: 2.57 km^{2} (0.99 sq mi)
- Elevation: 40 m (130 ft)
- Highest elevation: 51 m (167 ft)
- Lowest elevation: 36 m (118 ft)
- Population (2023): 1,654
  - Density: 644/km^{2} (1,670/sq mi)
- Time zone: UTC+01:00 (CET)
  - Summer (DST): UTC+02:00 (CEST)
- INSEE/Postal code: 59609 /59175
- ^{1} French Land Register data, which excludes lakes, ponds, glaciers > 1 km^{2} (0.386 sq mi or 247 acres) and river estuaries.

Vendeville (French pronunciation: [vɑ̃dvil]) is a commune in the Nord department in northern France. It is part of the Métropole Européenne de Lille.

== Heraldry ==
Arms of Vendeville	The arms of Vendeville are blazoned : Plumetty Or and sable. (Mérignies and Vendeville use the same arms.)

== See also ==
- Communes of the Nord department
