= Le Train Michon =

Railway line in France

Coordinates: 50.551857°N 2.9142833°E

Don-Sainghin–Fromelles
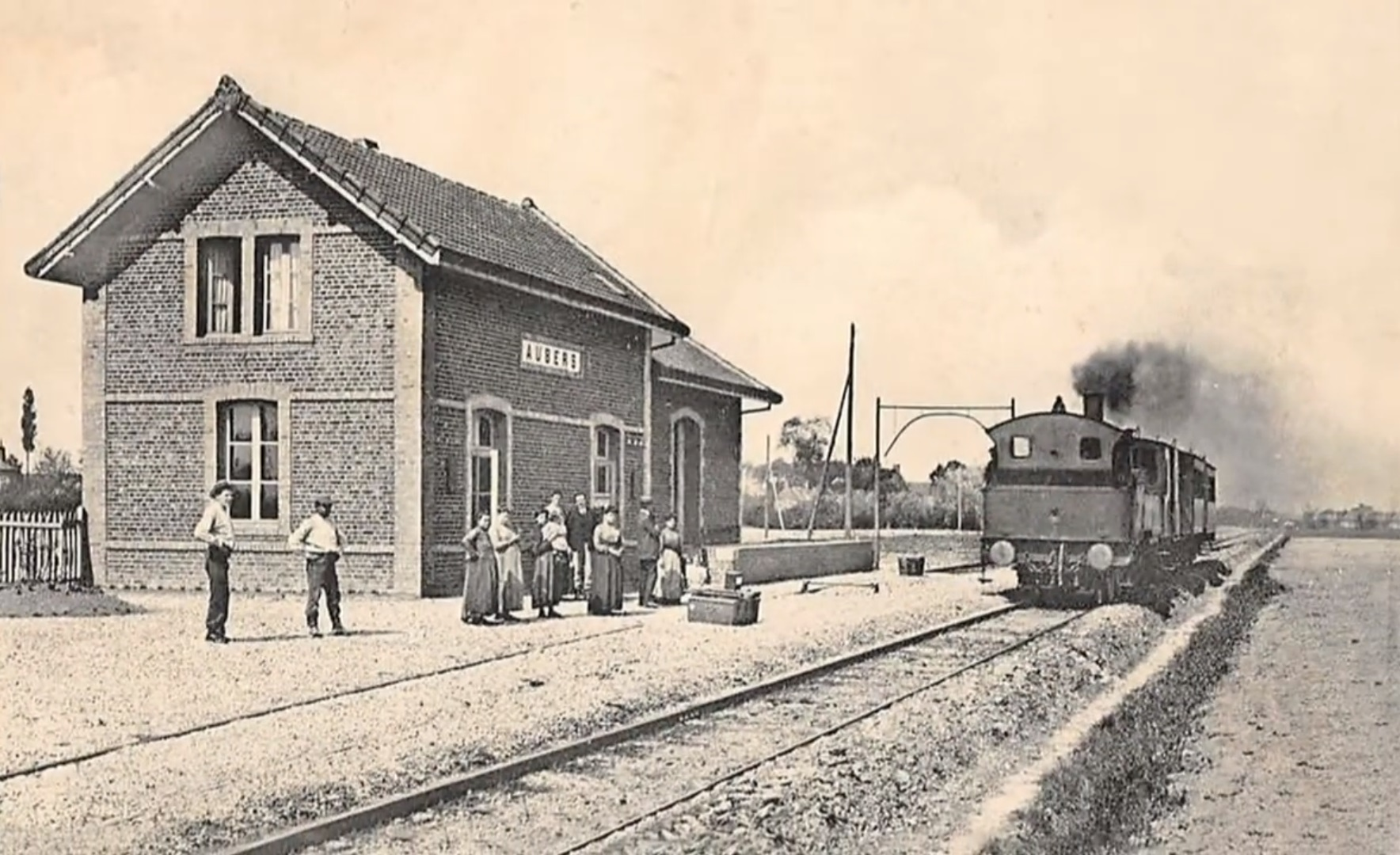
- Aubers

Technical
- Line length: 18 km (11 mi)
- Track gauge: 1,435 mm (4 ft 8 1/2 in); 600 mm (1 ft 11 5/8 in)
Route map
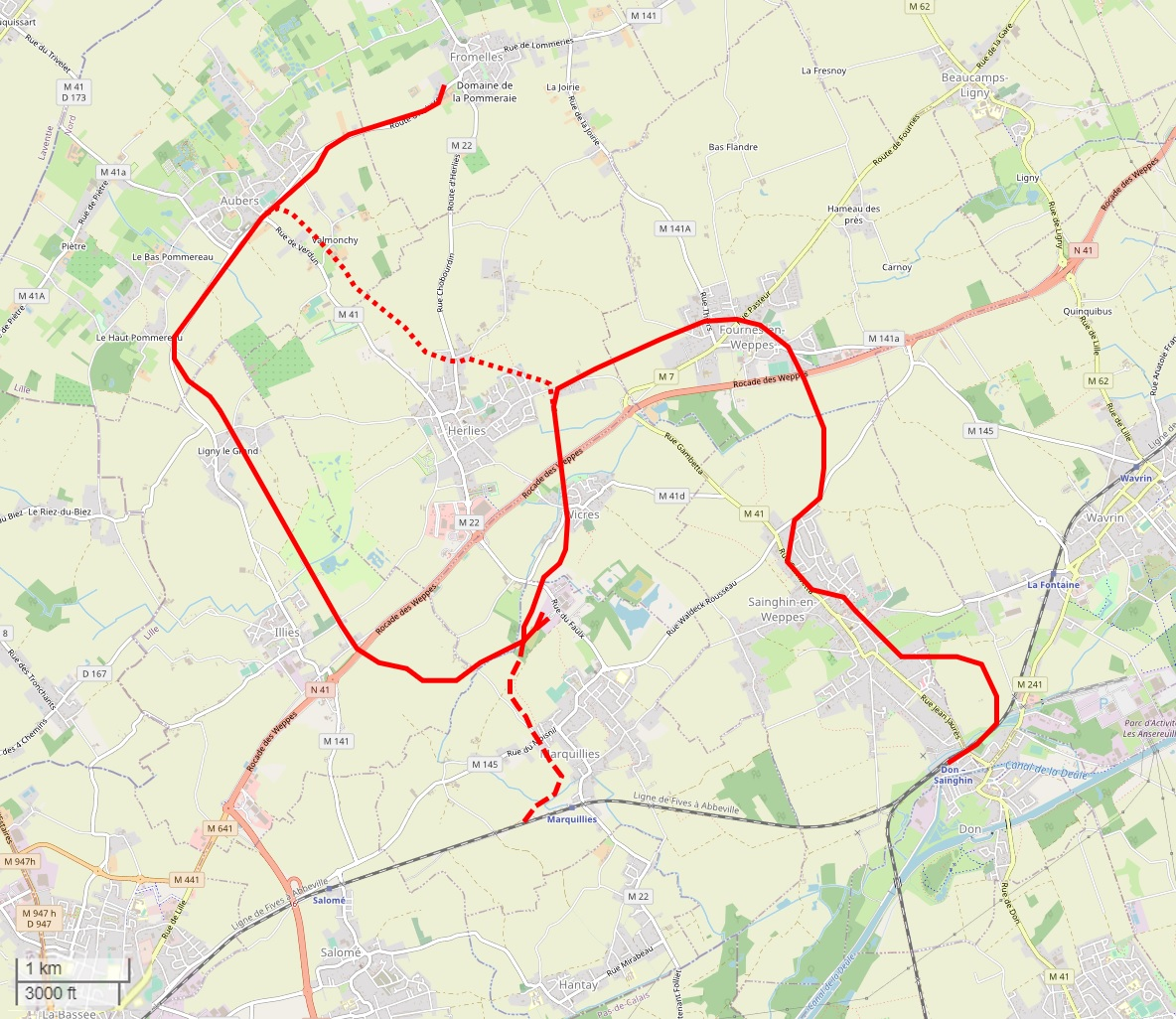
Former route of the main line of 1906 (solid),
the connecting line to the sugar mill of 1908 (dashed)
and the military light railway of 1914-1918 (dotted)

Le Train Michon was an 18 kilometres (11 miles) long secondary railway line from Don-Sainghin to Fromelles in the Weppes^{(fr)} plain in northern France.

== Route ==
The standard-gauge branch line with a gauge of 1,435 mm (4 ft 8 1/2 in) ran in an S-shape from Don via Sainghin-en-Weppes, Fournes-en-Weppes, Herlies, Marquillies, Illies and Aubers to Fromelles. Its winding routing would not have been necessary due to the almost flat topography of the Weppes, but corresponded to the desire to serve several industrial plants existing at the time in order to maximise the volume of passenger and freight traffic. Around 1908, a connecting railway was laid to link the Marquillies sugar factory at Marquillies-Sud station.

== History ==
Mathieu Michon (1839-1923) founded the C^{ie} des Chemins de Fer d'Interet local du Nord de la France on 8 September 1901 and was granted the concession to build and operate the line on 19 April 1902. The line was officially opened on 6 September 1906 and was mainly used for freight traffic, in particular to transport sugar beet, coal, building materials and beer barrels from the Motte Cordonnier brewery. The journey took about 40 to 45 minutes, sometimes over an hour.

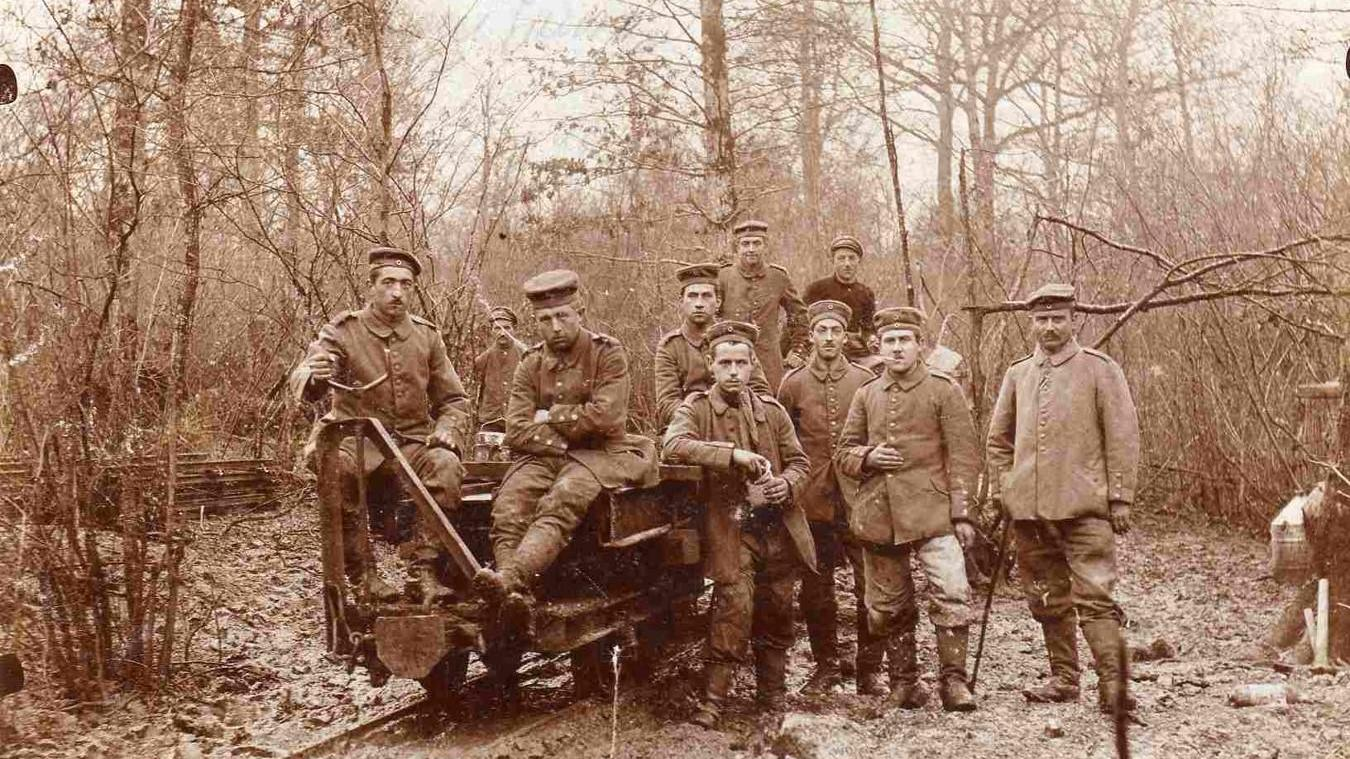
Narrow-gauge light railway of the German army during the First World War

During World War I, the line played an important role in transporting ammunition, supplies and building materials, as it was located immediately behind the front line in territory occupied by German forces. During the war, several standard and narrow gauge connecting lines were laid. The line was completely destroyed, but was rebuilt in sections in the post-war period from January 1920 and operated first by the Société générale des chemins de fer économiques (SE) later by the Chemins de fer du Nord and finally by the SNCF from 1938.

The Gombert boarding school in Fournes, a higher vocational school, used the railway on leaflets for its advertising. The pupils of the boarding school travelled from Fournes to Don on Sundays to get from there to Lille and back again in the evening.

Passenger services were discontinued in 1929. The line was closed in 1951.

== Stations ==
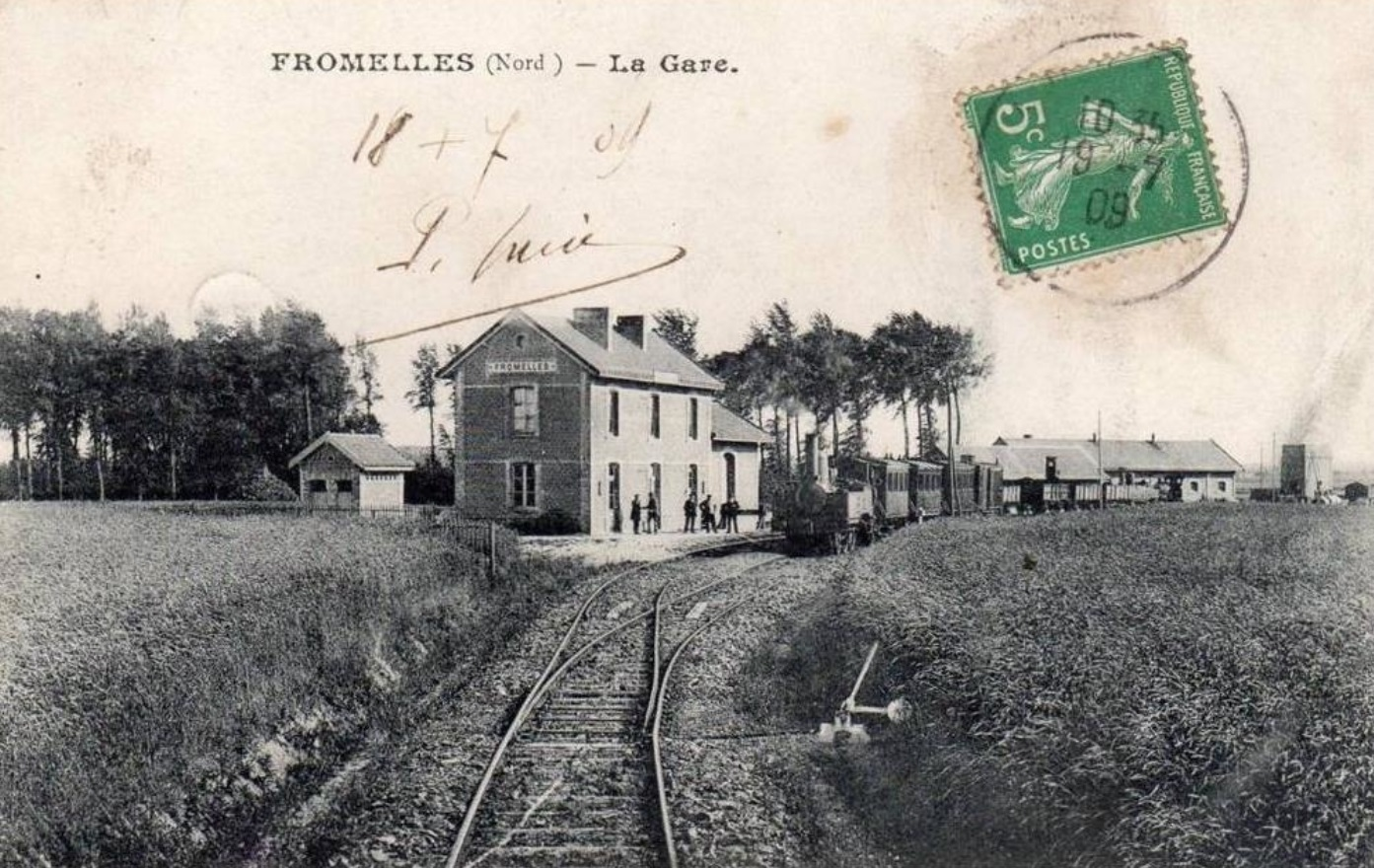
Fromelles

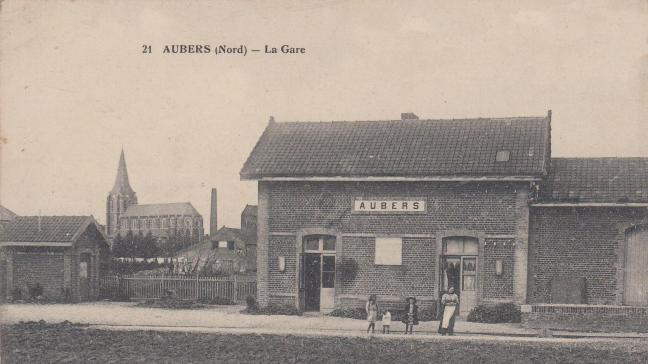
Aubers

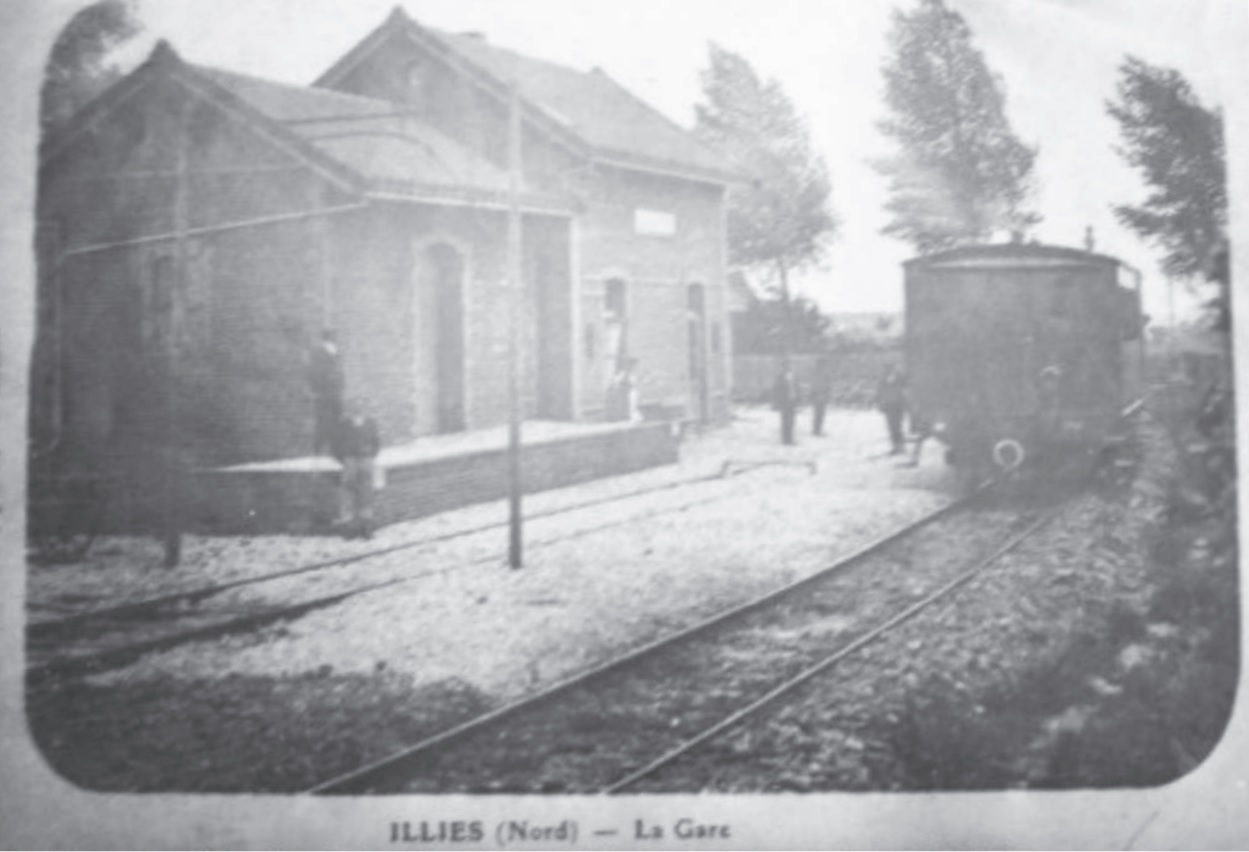
Illies

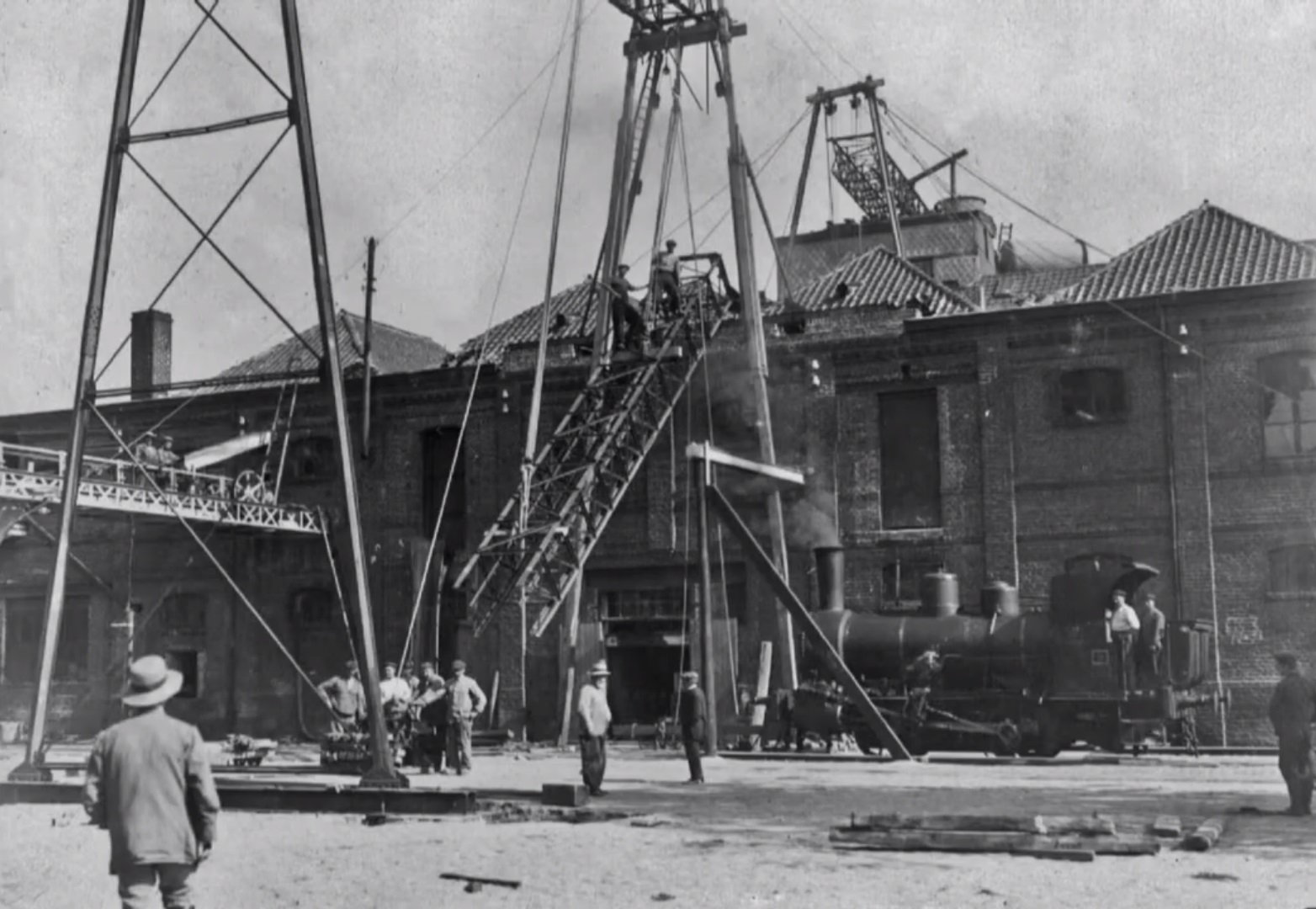
Marquillies (sugar mill)

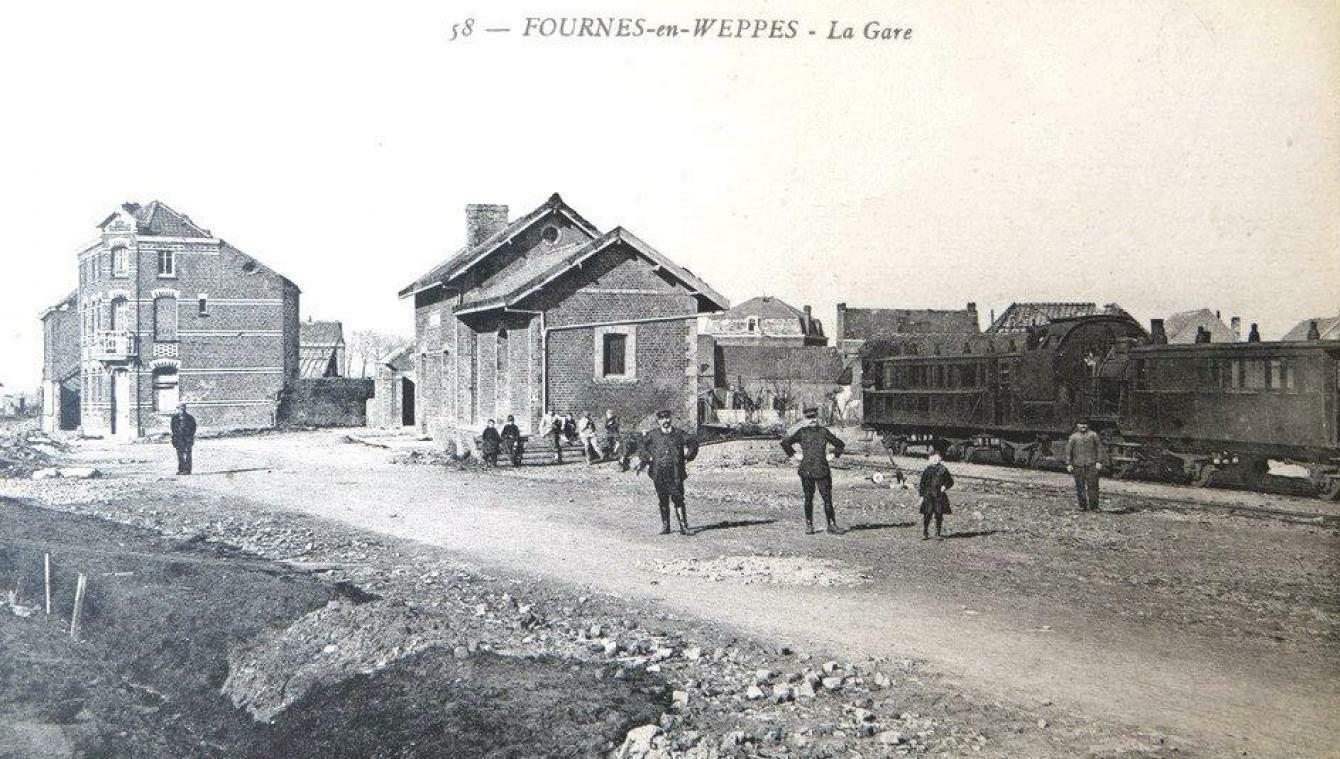
Fournes-en-Weppes

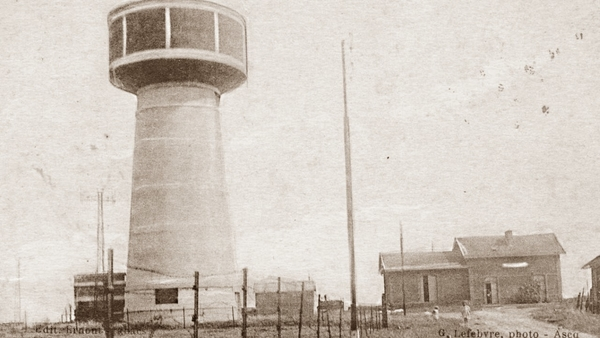
Sainghin-en-Weppes

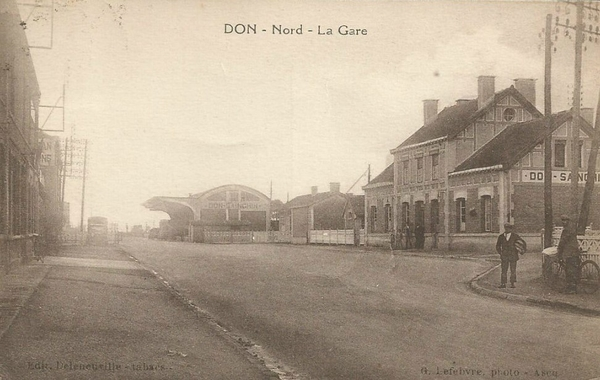
Don-Sainghin
