= Le Maisnil =

- Commune
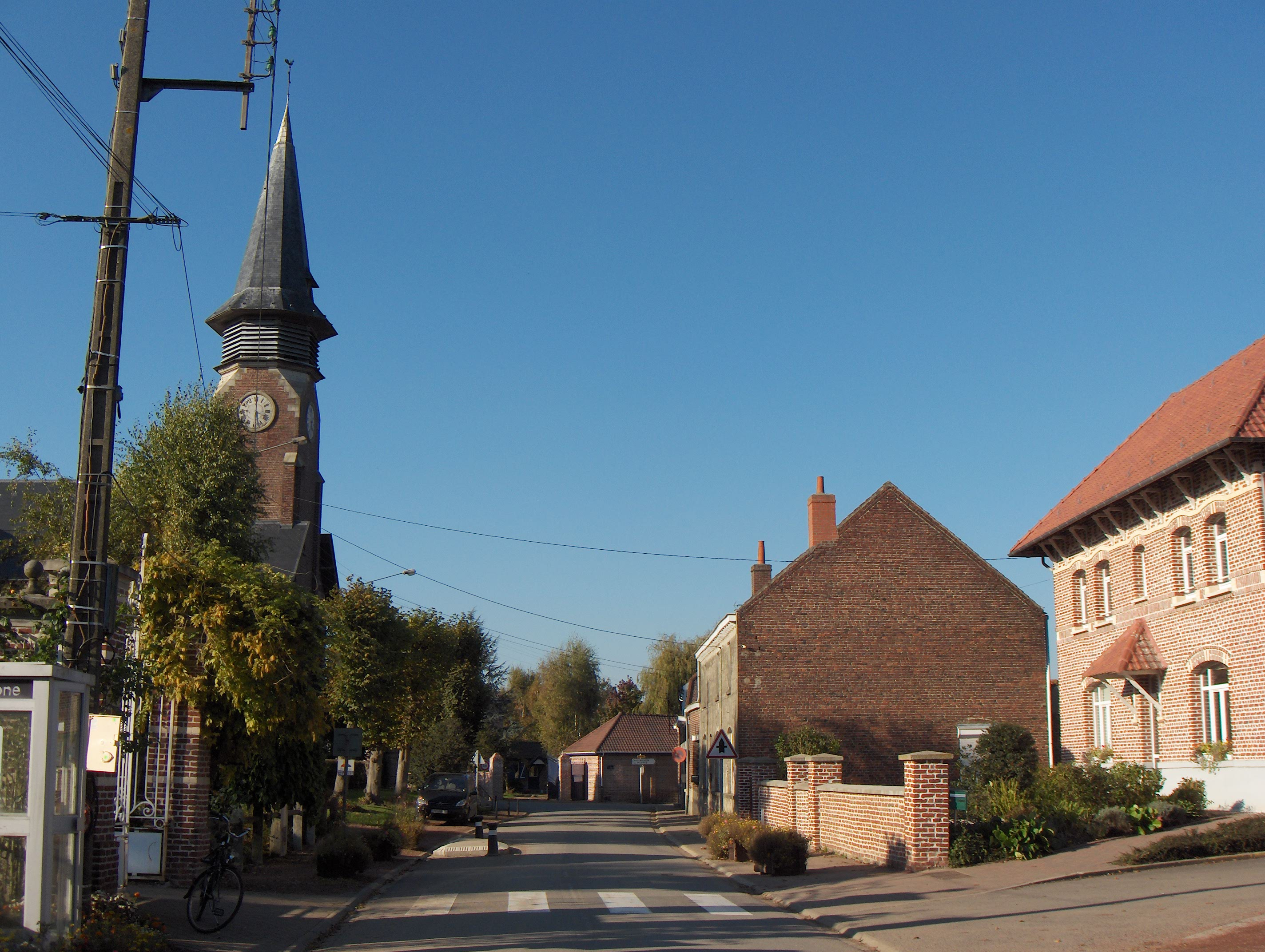
- A view within Le Maisnil

- Coat of arms
- Location of Le Maisnil
- Location within France Location within Hauts-de-France
- Coordinates: 50°36′56″N 2°53′10″E
- Country: France
- Region: Hauts-de-France
- Department: Nord
- Arrondissement: Lille
- Canton: Annœullin
- Intercommunality: Métropole Européenne de Lille

Government
  - Mayor (2020–2026): Michel Borrewater
- Area^{1}: 3.51 km^{2} (1.36 sq mi)
- Elevation: 24 m (79 ft)
- Highest elevation: 26 m (85 ft)
- Lowest elevation: 18 m (59 ft)
- Population (2023): 628
  - Density: 179/km^{2} (463/sq mi)
- Time zone: UTC+01:00 (CET)
  - Summer (DST): UTC+02:00 (CEST)
- INSEE/Postal code: 59371 /59134
- ^{1} French Land Register data, which excludes lakes, ponds, glaciers > 1 km^{2} (0.386 sq mi or 247 acres) and river estuaries.

Le Maisnil (French pronunciation: [lə mɛnil]) is a commune in the Nord department in northern France.

It is about 10 km (6.2 mi) west of Lille.

== Heraldry ==
Arms of Le Maisnil	The arms of Le Maisnil are blazoned : Azure, an inescutcheon within 7 martlets in orle argent.

== See also ==
- Communes of the Nord department
