= Hantay =

- Commune
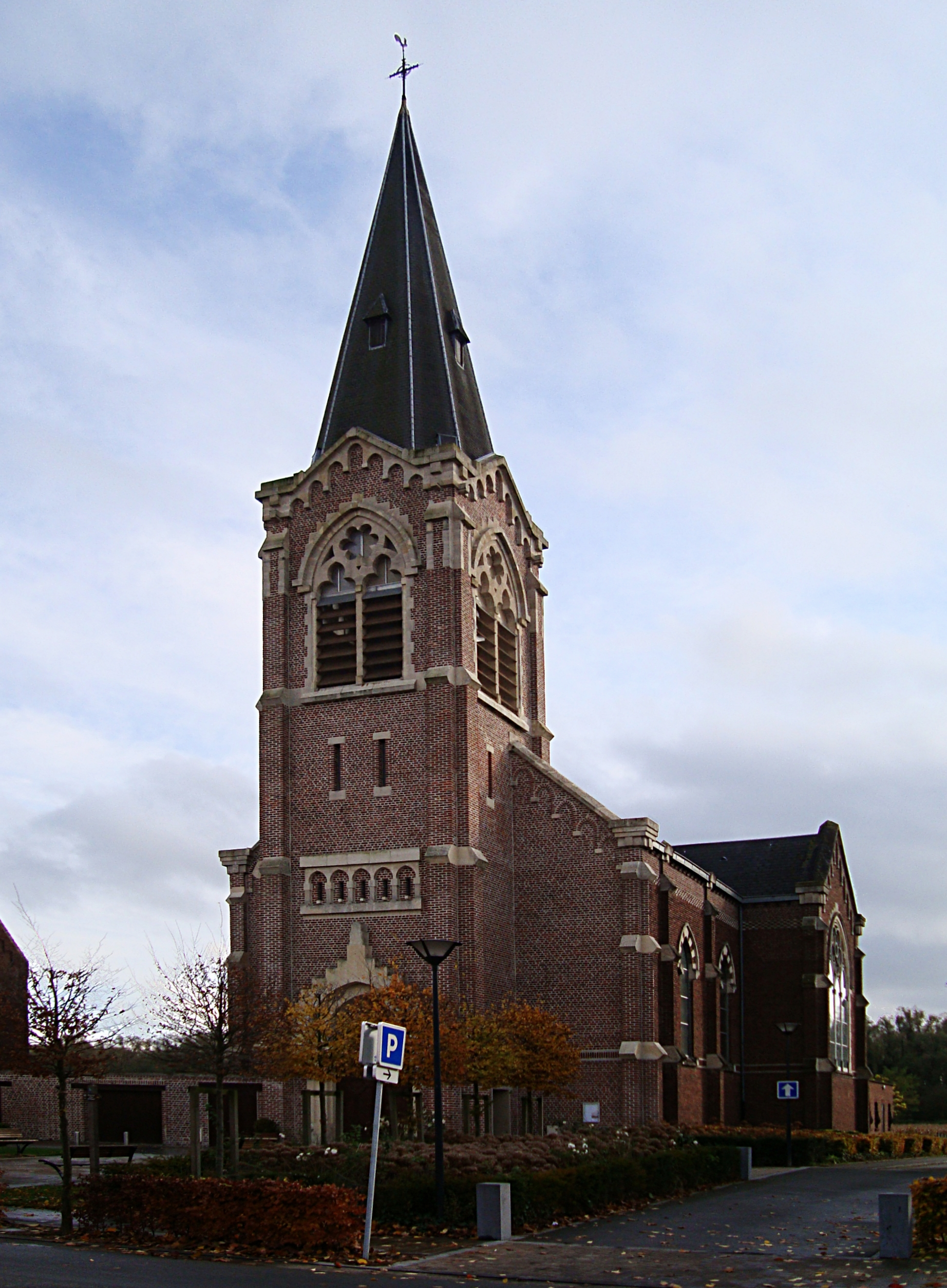
- The church in Hantay

- Coat of arms
- Location of Hantay
- Location within France Location within Hauts-de-France
- Coordinates: 50°32′11″N 2°52′23″E
- Country: France
- Region: Hauts-de-France
- Department: Nord
- Arrondissement: Lille
- Canton: Annœullin
- Intercommunality: Métropole Européenne de Lille

Government
  - Mayor (2020–2026): Jacques Montois
- Area^{1}: 2.09 km^{2} (0.81 sq mi)
- Elevation: 21 m (69 ft)
- Highest elevation: 25 m (82 ft)
- Lowest elevation: 20 m (66 ft)
- Population (2023): 1,244
  - Density: 595/km^{2} (1,540/sq mi)
- Time zone: UTC+01:00 (CET)
  - Summer (DST): UTC+02:00 (CEST)
- INSEE/Postal code: 59281 /59496
- ^{1} French Land Register data, which excludes lakes, ponds, glaciers > 1 km^{2} (0.386 sq mi or 247 acres) and river estuaries.

Hantay (French pronunciation: [ɑ̃tɛ]) is a commune in the Nord department in northern France. It is part of the Métropole Européenne de Lille.

== Heraldry ==
Arms of Hantay	The arms of Hantay are blazoned : Argent, 3 fesses gules within a bordure azure.

== See also ==
- Communes of the Nord department
