= Canton of Villeneuve-d'Ascq =

Canton of France

Coordinates: 50.62°N 3.15°E

The canton of Villeneuve-d'Ascq is an administrative division of the Nord department, northern France. It was created at the French canton reorganisation which came into effect in March 2015. Its seat is in Villeneuve-d'Ascq.

It consists of the following communes:

1. Forest-sur-Marque
2. Sailly-lez-Lannoy
3. Toufflers
4. Villeneuve-d'Ascq
5. Willems
