= Provin =

- Commune
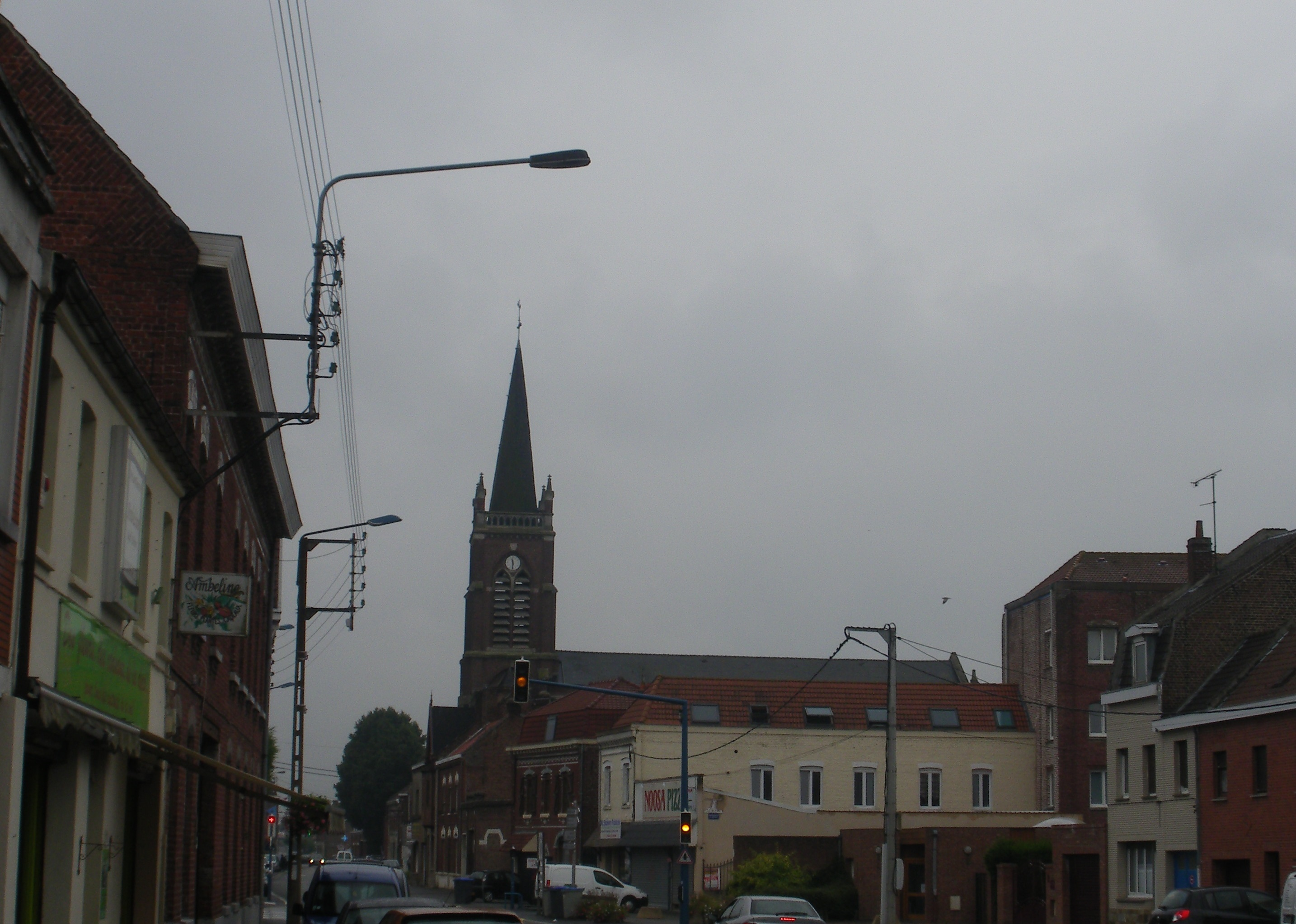
- The church in Provin

- Coat of arms
- Location of Provin
- Location within France Location within Hauts-de-France
- Coordinates: 50°30′56″N 2°54′49″E
- Country: France
- Region: Hauts-de-France
- Department: Nord
- Arrondissement: Lille
- Canton: Annœullin
- Intercommunality: Métropole Européenne de Lille

Government
  - Mayor (2023–2026): Kwami Agbegna
- Area^{1}: 3.39 km^{2} (1.31 sq mi)
- Elevation: 26 m (85 ft)
- Highest elevation: 34 m (112 ft)
- Lowest elevation: 19 m (62 ft)
- Population (2023): 4,428
  - Density: 1,310/km^{2} (3,380/sq mi)
- Time zone: UTC+01:00 (CET)
  - Summer (DST): UTC+02:00 (CEST)
- INSEE/Postal code: 59477 /59185
- ^{1} French Land Register data, which excludes lakes, ponds, glaciers > 1 km^{2} (0.386 sq mi or 247 acres) and river estuaries.

Provin (French pronunciation: [pʁɔvɛ̃]) is a commune in the Nord department in northern France.

== Population ==
Historical population
Year	Pop.	±% p.a.
1968	2,738	—
1975	3,030	+1.46%
1982	3,491	+2.04%
1990	3,499	+0.03%
1999	3,678	+0.56%
2007	3,841	+0.54%
2012	4,183	+1.72%
2017	4,234	+0.24%
2023	4,428	+0.75%
Source: INSEE

== Heraldry ==
Arms of Provin	The arms of Provin are blazoned : Azure, 6 mullets of 6 points 3,2,1 Or.

== See also ==
- Communes of the Nord department
