= Allennes-les-Marais =

- Commune
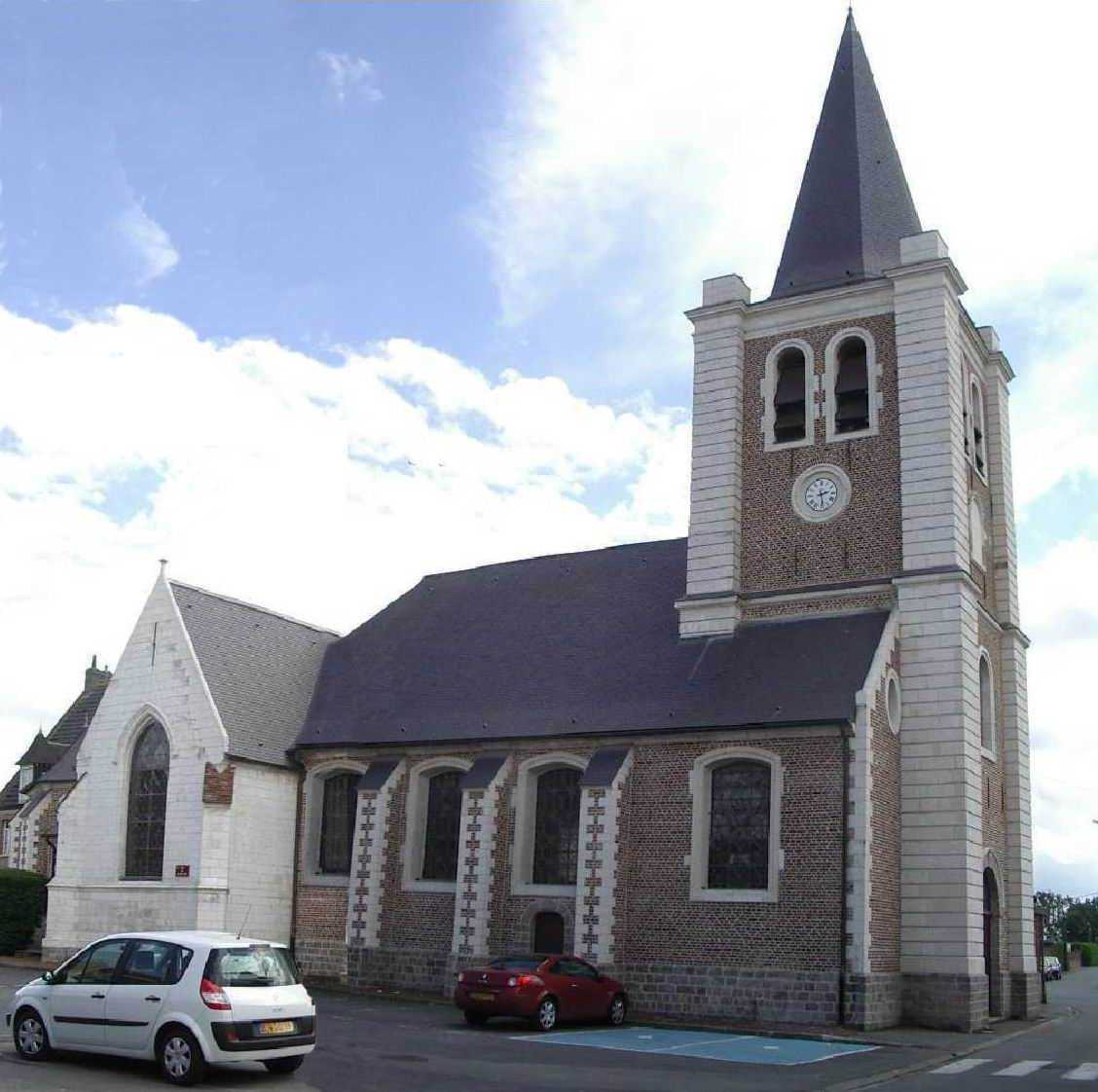
- The church in Allennes-les-Marais

- Coat of arms
- Location of Allennes-les-Marais
- Location within France Location within Hauts-de-France
- Coordinates: 50°32′12″N 2°57′06″E
- Country: France
- Region: Hauts-de-France
- Department: Nord
- Arrondissement: Lille
- Canton: Annœullin
- Intercommunality: Métropole Européenne de Lille

Government
  - Mayor (2024–2026): Carine Vandaele
- Area^{1}: 5.55 km^{2} (2.14 sq mi)
- Elevation: 25 m (82 ft)
- Highest elevation: 29 m (95 ft)
- Lowest elevation: 18 m (59 ft)
- Population (2023): 3,545
  - Density: 639/km^{2} (1,650/sq mi)
- Time zone: UTC+01:00 (CET)
  - Summer (DST): UTC+02:00 (CEST)
- INSEE/Postal code: 59005 /59251
- ^{1} French Land Register data, which excludes lakes, ponds, glaciers > 1 km^{2} (0.386 sq mi or 247 acres) and river estuaries.

Allennes-les-Marais (French pronunciation: [alɛn le maʁɛ]) is a commune in the Nord department in northern France.

== Population ==
Historical population

| Year | Pop. | ±% p.a. |
|---|---|---|
| 1793 | 547 | — |
| 1821 | 733 | +1.05% |
| 1846 | 870 | +0.69% |
| 1872 | 1,021 | +0.62% |
| 1901 | 1,175 | +0.49% |
| 1926 | 1,145 | −0.10% |
| 1946 | 1,142 | −0.01% |
| 1962 | 1,658 | +2.36% |
| 1968 | 1,837 | +1.72% |

| Year | Pop. | ±% p.a. |
|---|---|---|
| 1975 | 1,893 | +0.43% |
| 1982 | 2,426 | +3.61% |
| 1990 | 2,773 | +1.69% |
| 1999 | 3,234 | +1.72% |
| 2007 | 3,393 | +0.60% |
| 2012 | 3,357 | −0.21% |
| 2017 | 3,460 | +0.61% |
| 2023 | 3,545 | +0.41% |

Source: EHESS and INSEE (1968-2023)

== Heraldry ==
| Arms of Allennes-les-Marais | The arms of Allennes-les-Marais are blazoned : Or, 10 lozenges conjoined gules 3,3,3 and 1. |

== International relations ==
Allennes-les-Marais is twinned with:

- Białobrzegi, Poland

== See also ==
- Communes of the Nord department
