= Carnin =

- Commune
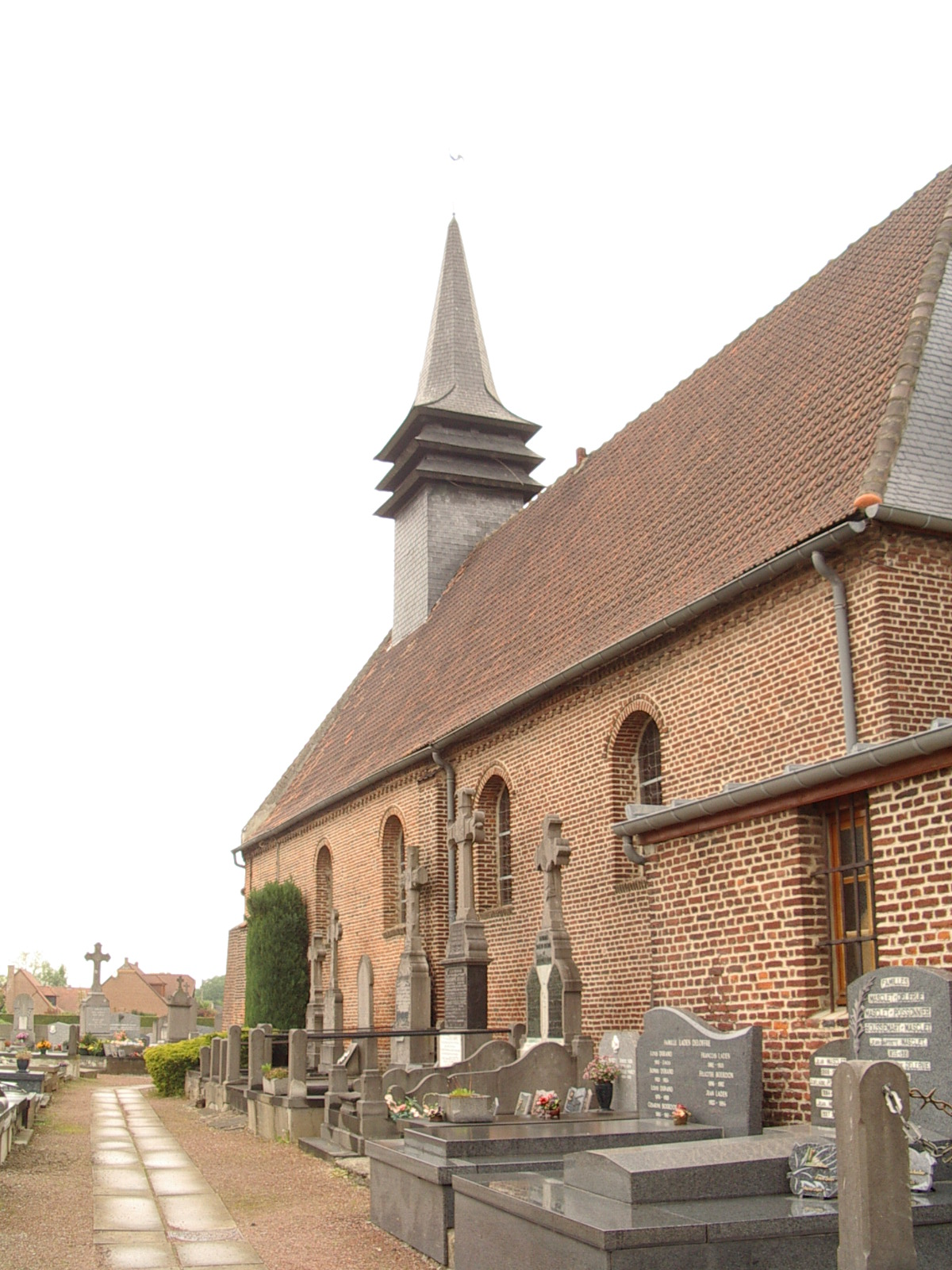
- The church in Carnin

- Coat of arms
- Location of Carnin
- Location within France Location within Hauts-de-France
- Coordinates: 50°31′15″N 2°57′31″E
- Country: France
- Region: Hauts-de-France
- Department: Nord
- Arrondissement: Lille
- Canton: Annœullin
- Intercommunality: Métropole Européenne de Lille

Government
  - Mayor (2020–2026): Louis Marcy
- Area^{1}: 2.33 km^{2} (0.90 sq mi)
- Elevation: 28 m (92 ft)
- Highest elevation: 34 m (112 ft)
- Lowest elevation: 21 m (69 ft)
- Population (2023): 1,105
  - Density: 474/km^{2} (1,230/sq mi)
- Time zone: UTC+01:00 (CET)
  - Summer (DST): UTC+02:00 (CEST)
- INSEE/Postal code: 59133 /59112
- ^{1} French Land Register data, which excludes lakes, ponds, glaciers > 1 km^{2} (0.386 sq mi or 247 acres) and river estuaries.

Carnin (French pronunciation: [kaʁnɛ̃]) is a commune in the Nord department in northern France.

== Heraldry ==
| Arms of Carnin | The arms of Carnin are blazoned : Argent, 3 lion heads gules, langued and crowned azure. |

== See also ==
- Communes of the Nord department
