= Annœullin =

- Commune
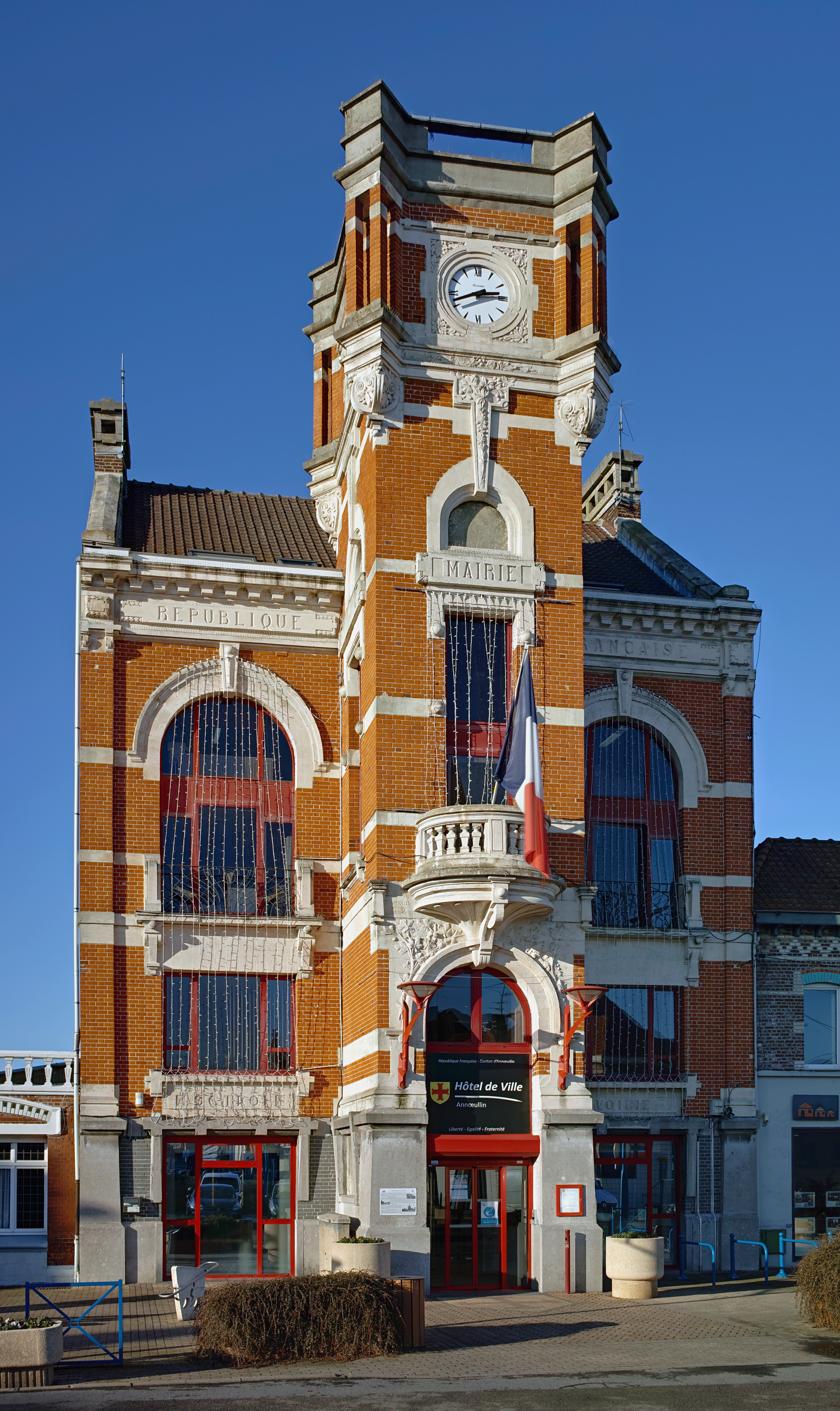
- The town hall in Annœullin

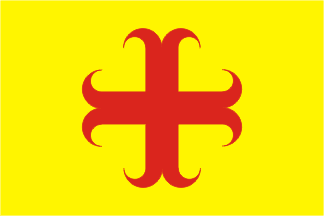
- Flag Coat of arms
- Location of Annœullin
- Location within France Location within Hauts-de-France
- Coordinates: 50°31′48″N 2°56′01″E
- Country: France
- Region: Hauts-de-France
- Department: Nord
- Arrondissement: Lille
- Canton: Annœullin
- Intercommunality: Métropole Européenne de Lille

Government
  - Mayor (2020–2026): Philippe Parsy
- Area^{1}: 9.01 km^{2} (3.48 sq mi)
- Elevation: 25 m (82 ft)
- Highest elevation: 31 m (102 ft)
- Lowest elevation: 19 m (62 ft)
- Population (2023): 10,847
  - Density: 1,200/km^{2} (3,120/sq mi)
- Time zone: UTC+01:00 (CET)
  - Summer (DST): UTC+02:00 (CEST)
- INSEE/Postal code: 59011 /59112
- ^{1} French Land Register data, which excludes lakes, ponds, glaciers > 1 km^{2} (0.386 sq mi or 247 acres) and river estuaries.

Annœullin (French pronunciation: [anølɛ̃]) is a commune in the Nord department in northern France.

== Population ==
Historical population

Year	Pop.	±% p.a.
1793	2,418	—
1800	2,514	+0.56%
1806	2,639	+0.81%
1821	3,020	+0.90%
1831	3,053	+0.11%
1836	3,178	+0.81%
1841	3,210	+0.20%
1846	3,416	+1.25%
1851	3,405	−0.06%
1856	3,368	−0.22%
1861	3,883	+2.89%
1866	3,805	−0.41%
1872	3,980	+0.75%
1876	4,148	+1.04%
1881	4,156	+0.04%
1886	4,493	+1.57%
1891	4,748	+1.11%
1896	5,013	+1.09%
1901	5,121	+0.43%

Year	Pop.	±% p.a.
1906	5,281	+0.62%
1911	5,731	+1.65%
1921	5,322	−0.74%
1926	5,879	+2.01%
1931	6,190	+1.04%
1936	6,283	+0.30%
1946	6,408	+0.20%
1954	5,676	−1.50%
1962	5,976	+0.65%
1968	6,319	+0.93%
1975	6,127	−0.44%
1982	7,214	+2.36%
1990	8,787	+2.50%
1999	9,719	+1.13%
2007	9,795	+0.10%
2012	10,335	+1.08%
2017	10,428	+0.18%
2023	10,847	+0.66%

Source: EHESS and INSEE (1968-2023)

== Heraldry ==
Arms of Annœullin	The arms of Annœullin are blazoned : Or, a cross moline gules. (Annœullin, Bauvin and Mons-en-Pévèle use the same arms.)

== See also ==
- Communes of the Nord department
