= Forest-sur-Marque =

- Commune
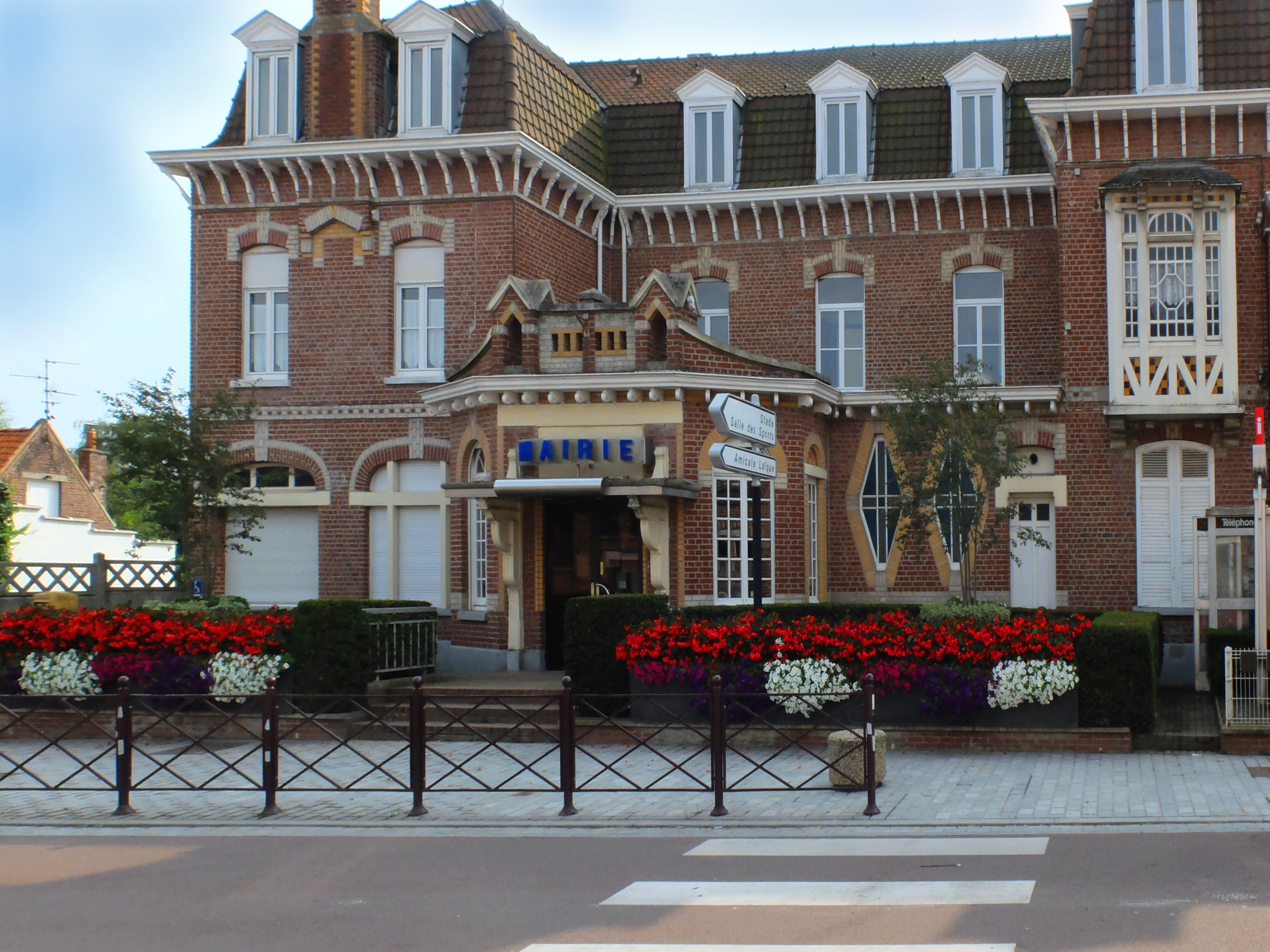
- The town hall in Forest-sur-Marque

- Coat of arms
- Location of Forest-sur-Marque
- Location within France Location within Hauts-de-France
- Coordinates: 50°38′05″N 3°11′24″E
- Country: France
- Region: Hauts-de-France
- Department: Nord
- Arrondissement: Lille
- Canton: Villeneuve-d'Ascq
- Intercommunality: Métropole Européenne de Lille

Government
  - Mayor (2021–2026): Thibault Dillies
- Area^{1}: 1.05 km^{2} (0.41 sq mi)
- Elevation: 24 m (79 ft)
- Highest elevation: 25 m (82 ft)
- Lowest elevation: 21 m (69 ft)
- Population (2023): 1,662
  - Density: 1,580/km^{2} (4,100/sq mi)
- Time zone: UTC+01:00 (CET)
  - Summer (DST): UTC+02:00 (CEST)
- INSEE/Postal code: 59247 /59510
- ^{1} French Land Register data, which excludes lakes, ponds, glaciers > 1 km^{2} (0.386 sq mi or 247 acres) and river estuaries.

Forest-sur-Marque (French pronunciation: [fɔʁɛ syʁ maʁk], lit. 'Forest on Marque') is a commune in the Nord department in northern France. It is part of the Métropole Européenne de Lille. A border town, it lies 5 km away from the Belgian border.

== Heraldry ==
Arms of Forest-sur-Marque	The arms of Forest-sur-Marque are blazoned : Gules, a chief argent.

== See also ==
- Communes of the Nord department
