= Toufflers =

- Commune
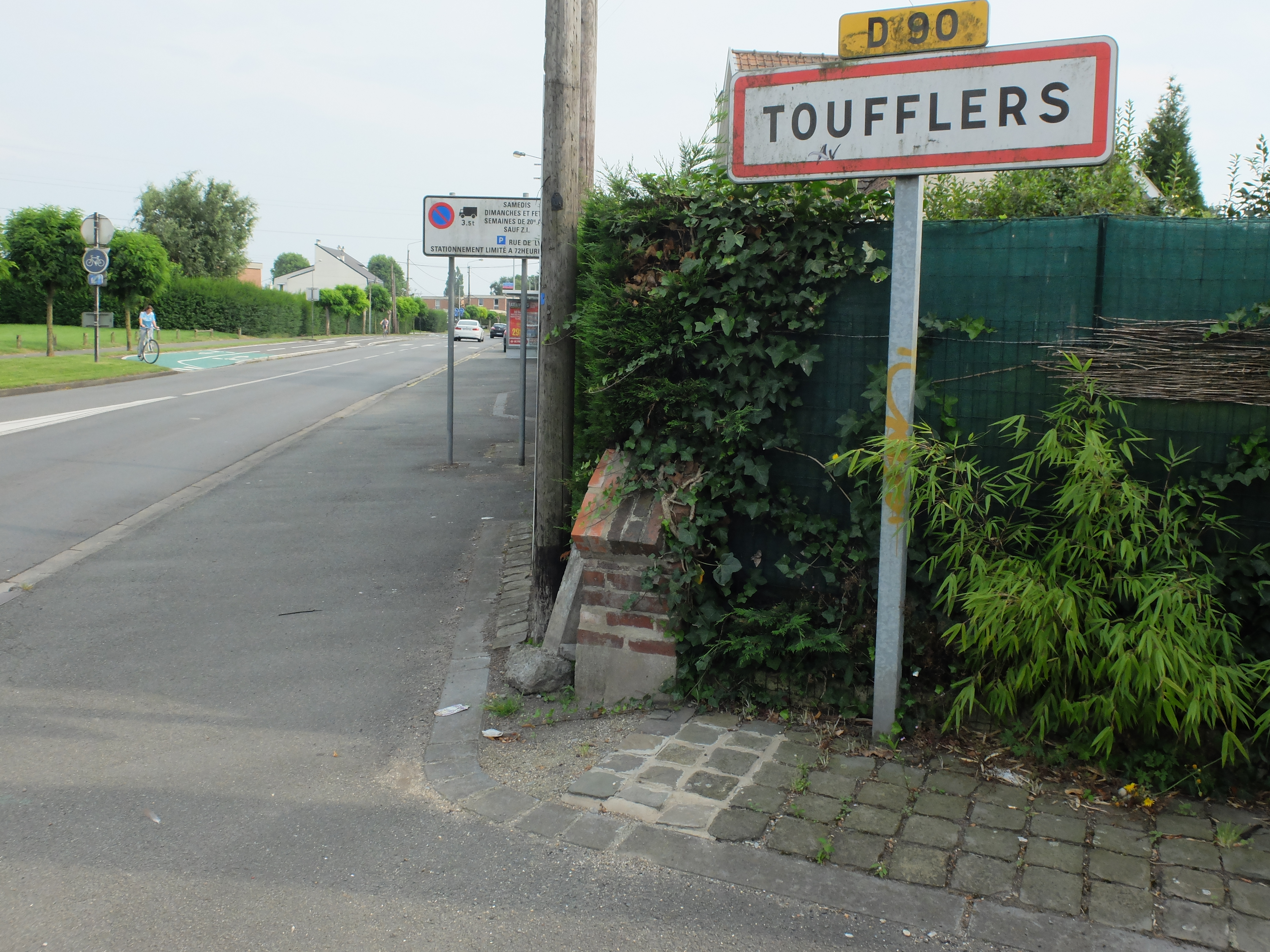
- The road into Toufflers

- Coat of arms
- Location of Toufflers
- Location within France Location within Hauts-de-France
- Coordinates: 50°39′42″N 3°13′49″E
- Country: France
- Region: Hauts-de-France
- Department: Nord
- Arrondissement: Lille
- Canton: Villeneuve-d'Ascq
- Intercommunality: Métropole Européenne de Lille

Government
  - Mayor (2020–2026): Alain Gonce
- Area^{1}: 2.39 km^{2} (0.92 sq mi)
- Elevation: 40 m (130 ft)
- Highest elevation: 43 m (141 ft)
- Lowest elevation: 23 m (75 ft)
- Population (2023): 3,957
  - Density: 1,660/km^{2} (4,290/sq mi)
- Time zone: UTC+01:00 (CET)
  - Summer (DST): UTC+02:00 (CEST)
- INSEE/Postal code: 59598 /59390
- ^{1} French Land Register data, which excludes lakes, ponds, glaciers > 1 km^{2} (0.386 sq mi or 247 acres) and river estuaries.

Toufflers (French pronunciation: [tuflɛʁs]; Dutch: Toflaar) is a commune in the Nord department in northern France.

Its inhabitants are called Toufflersois.

== Population ==
Historical population
Year	Pop.	±% p.a.
1968	2,531	—
1975	2,501	−0.17%
1982	3,489	+4.87%
1990	3,590	+0.36%
1999	3,864	+0.82%
2007	3,691	−0.57%
2012	3,990	+1.57%
2017	3,905	−0.43%
2023	3,957	+0.22%
Source: INSEE

== Heraldry ==
Arms of Toufflers	The arms of Toufflers are blazoned : Argent, 3 lions vert armed and langued gules, crowned Or, and each charged with an inescutcheon argent, a cross azure.

== See also ==
- Communes of the Nord department
