= Willems, Nord =

Willems
- Commune
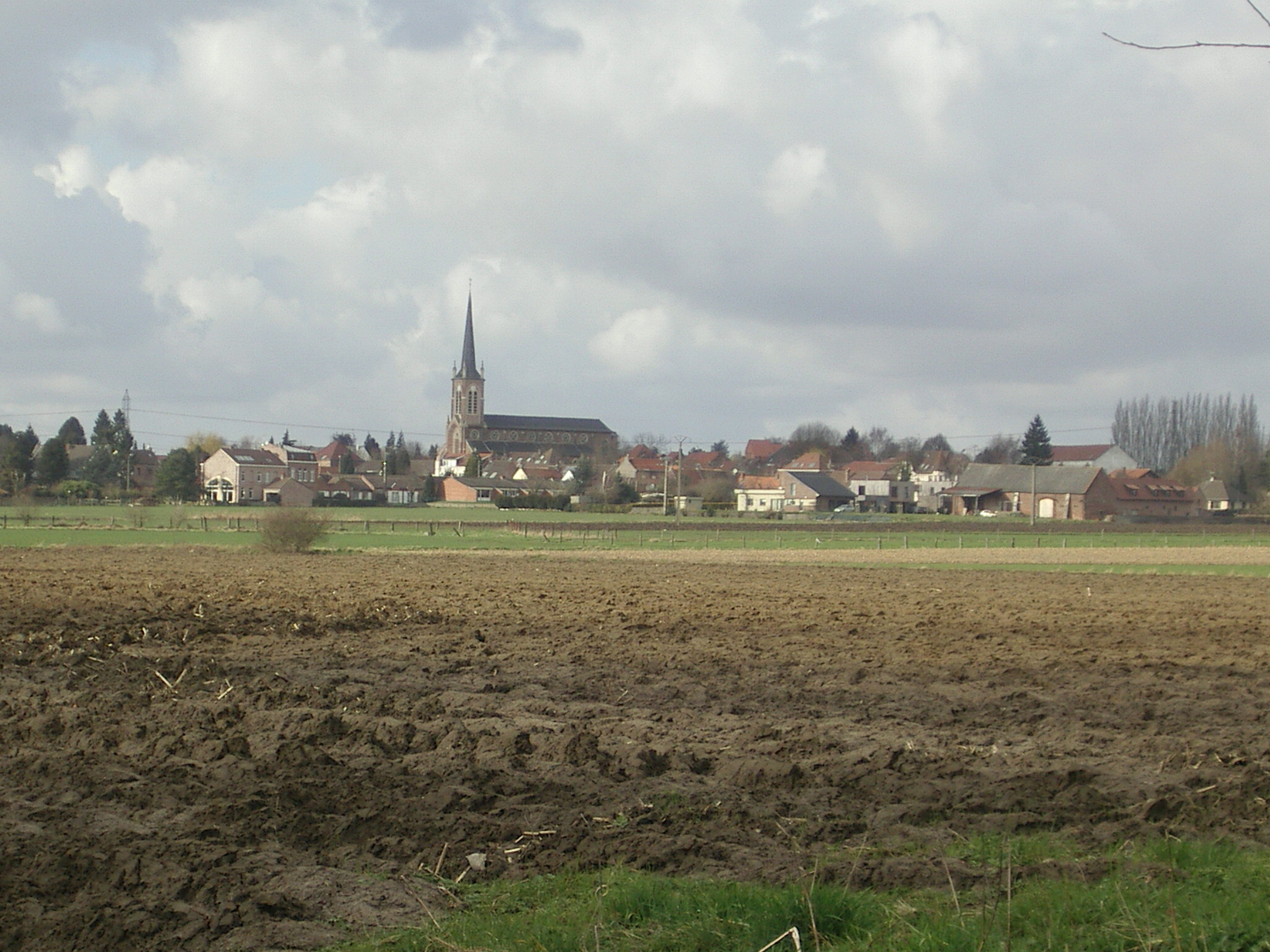
- Landscape view of Willems

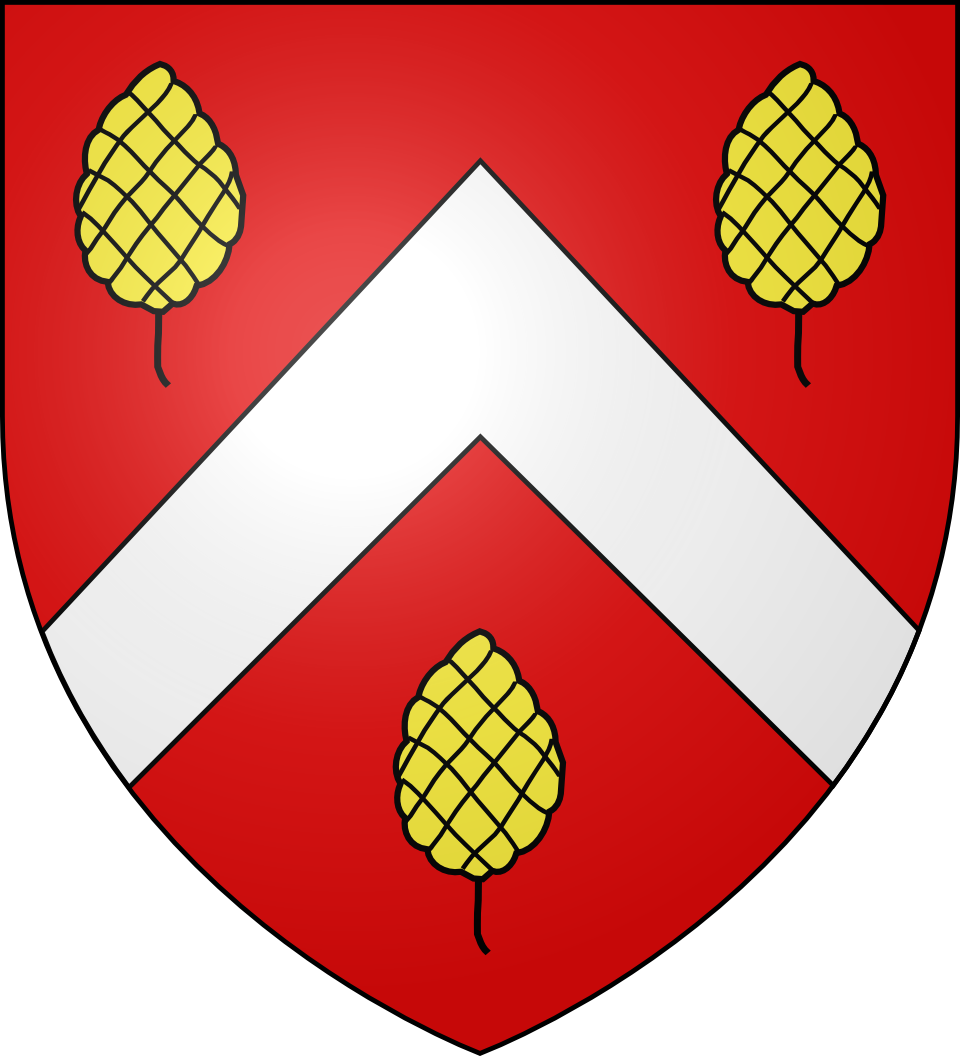
- Coat of arms
- Location of Willems
- Location within France Location within Hauts-de-France
- Coordinates: 50°37′58″N 3°14′21″E
- Country: France
- Region: Hauts-de-France
- Department: Nord
- Arrondissement: Lille
- Canton: Villeneuve-d'Ascq
- Intercommunality: Métropole Lille

Government
  - Mayor (2020–2026): Thierry Rolland
- Area^{1}: 5.8 km^{2} (2.2 sq mi)
- Elevation: 58 m (190 ft)
- Highest elevation: 48 m (157 ft)
- Lowest elevation: 22 m (72 ft)
- Population (2023): 2,941
  - Density: 510/km^{2} (1,300/sq mi)
- Time zone: UTC+01:00 (CET)
  - Summer (DST): UTC+02:00 (CEST)
- INSEE/Postal code: 59660 /59780
- Website: www.willems.fr
- ^{1} French Land Register data, which excludes lakes, ponds, glaciers > 1 km^{2} (0.386 sq mi or 247 acres) and river estuaries.

Willems (French pronunciation: [wilɛm]; Dutch: Willems) is a commune in the Nord department in northern France.

== Heraldry ==
Arms of Willems	The arms of Willems are blazoned : Gules, a chevron argent between three pinecones Or.

== Population ==
Historical population
Year	Pop.	±% p.a.
1968	1,923	—
1975	2,006	+0.61%
1982	2,506	+3.23%
1990	2,681	+0.85%
1999	2,799	+0.48%
2007	2,967	+0.73%
2012	3,045	+0.52%
2017	3,021	−0.16%
2023	2,941	−0.45%
Source: INSEE

== See also ==
- Communes of the Nord department
