= La Bassée =

- Commune
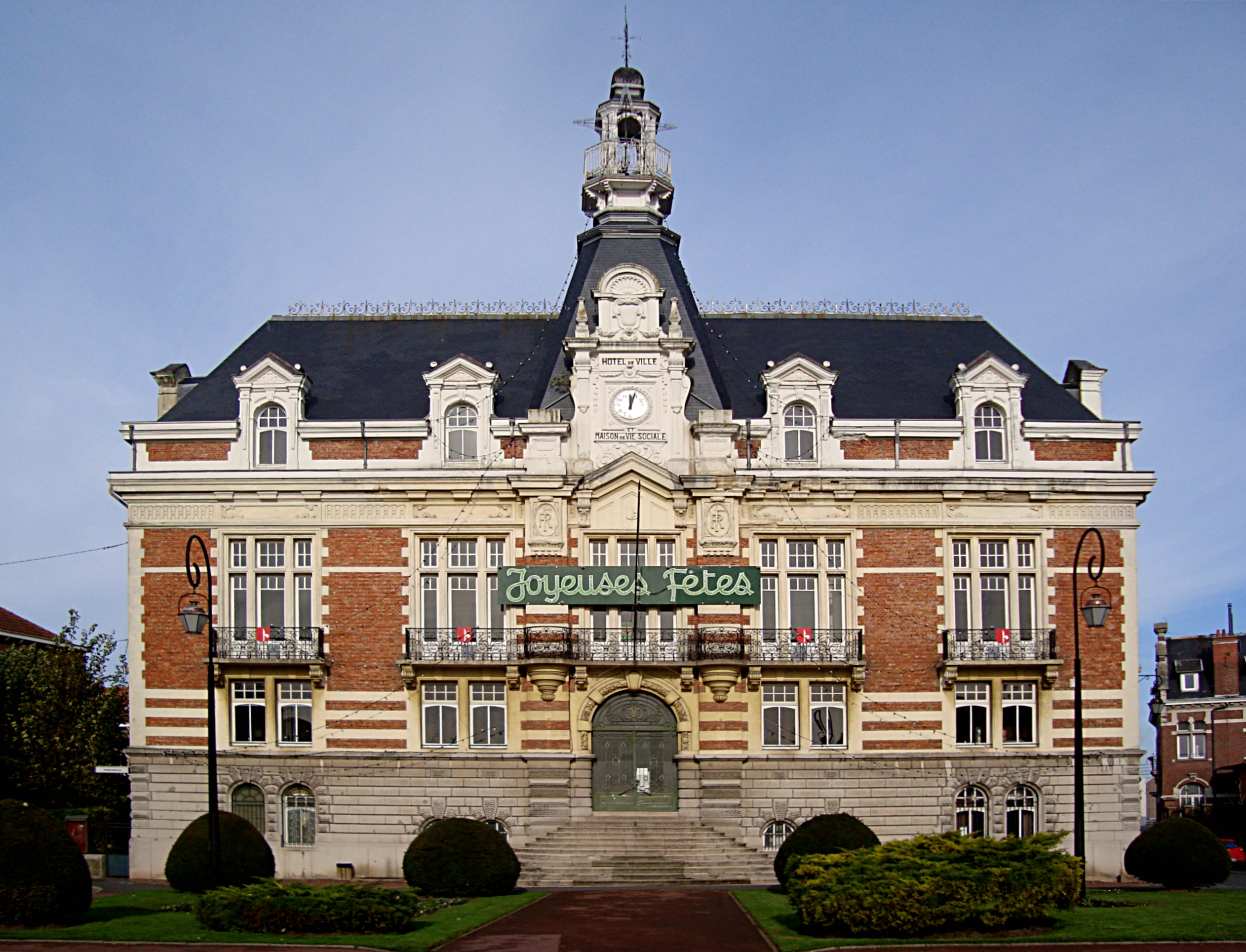
- The town hall in La Bassée

- Coat of arms
- Location of La Bassée
- Location within France Location within Hauts-de-France
- Coordinates: 50°32′03″N 2°48′29″E
- Country: France
- Region: Hauts-de-France
- Department: Nord
- Arrondissement: Lille
- Canton: Annœullin
- Intercommunality: Métropole Européenne de Lille

Government
  - Mayor (2020–2026): Frédéric Cauderlier
- Area^{1}: 3.54 km^{2} (1.37 sq mi)
- Elevation: 43 m (141 ft)
- Highest elevation: 31 m (102 ft)
- Lowest elevation: 21 m (69 ft)
- Population (2023): 6,650
  - Density: 1,880/km^{2} (4,870/sq mi)
- Time zone: UTC+01:00 (CET)
  - Summer (DST): UTC+02:00 (CEST)
- INSEE/Postal code: 59051 /59480
- ^{1} French Land Register data, which excludes lakes, ponds, glaciers > 1 km^{2} (0.386 sq mi or 247 acres) and river estuaries.

La Bassée (French pronunciation: [la base]) is a commune in the Nord department in northern France.

== Population ==
Historical population

Year	Pop.	±% p.a.
1793	2,108	—
1800	2,171	+0.42%
1806	2,209	+0.29%
1821	2,414	+0.59%
1831	2,480	+0.27%
1836	2,485	+0.04%
1841	2,475	−0.08%
1846	2,540	+0.52%
1851	2,755	+1.64%
1856	2,763	+0.06%
1861	2,958	+1.37%
1866	3,170	+1.39%
1872	3,246	+0.40%
1876	3,415	+1.28%
1881	3,545	+0.75%
1886	3,678	+0.74%
1891	3,907	+1.22%
1896	4,017	+0.56%
1901	4,392	+1.80%

Year	Pop.	±% p.a.
1906	4,631	+1.07%
1911	4,819	+0.80%
1921	2,120	−7.88%
1926	3,527	+10.72%
1931	4,109	+3.10%
1936	4,416	+1.45%
1946	4,855	+0.95%
1954	5,004	+0.38%
1962	5,355	+0.85%
1968	5,463	+0.33%
1975	6,025	+1.41%
1982	6,319	+0.68%
1990	6,017	−0.61%
1999	5,914	−0.19%
2007	6,084	+0.35%
2012	6,413	+1.06%
2017	6,402	−0.03%
2023	6,650	+0.64%

Source: EHESS and INSEE (1968-2023)

== Heraldry ==
Arms of La Bassée	The arms of La Bassée are blazoned : Gules, a demi fleur de lys issuant from the center line argent.

== Personalities ==
La Bassée was the birthplace of the painter and draftsman Louis-Léopold Boilly (1761–1845).

Another native was Ignace François Broutin (c. 1690–1751), a colonial officer, surveyor, architect and engineer in Louisiana (New France).

== See also ==
- Communes of the Nord department
