= Métropole Européenne de Lille =

Coordinates: 50°38′14″N 3°03′47″E

- Métropole

- Location in the department of Nord
- Country: France
- Region: Hauts-de-France
- Department: Nord
- No. of communes: 95
- Established: January 1, 2015

Government
  - President (2020–2026): Damien Castelain
- Area: 671.9 km^{2} (259.4 sq mi)
- Population (2019): 1,179,050
  - Density: 1,755/km^{2} (4,545/sq mi)
- Website: lillemetropole.fr

The Métropole Européenne de Lille (French pronunciation: [metʁɔpɔl øʁɔpeɛn də lil], MEL; English: "European Metropolis of Lille") is the métropole, an intercommunal structure, composed by a network of big cities (Lille, Roubaix, Tourcoing, Villeneuve d'Ascq, Armentières etc.) whose major city is the city of Lille. It is located in the Nord department, in the Hauts-de-France region, northern France – bordering both the Flemish and Walloon regions of Belgium. It was created in January 2015, replacing the previous Communauté urbaine de Lille, and covers that part of the Lille metropolitan area that lies in France. Its area is 671.9 km^{2} (259.4 sq mi). Its population was 1,179,050 in 2019, of which 234,475 in Lille proper. The annual budget of the métropole is €1,865 billion (2018).

== History ==
The urban community was founded in 1967 with Augustin Laurent as its first president.

Then, in 1971, Arthur Notebart, Deputy Mayor of Lomme, succeeded him until the election of Pierre Mauroy in 1989.

After the March 2008 municipal elections, each city council sent delegates to the urban community, a total of 170 voting members.

In April 2008, a new president was to be elected on a majority vote, defined at 816 votes. It caused for intense lobbying throughout the 85 cities and villages. One key issue was the investment priorities for the 2008/2014 period, namely transport, housing and the environment. The newly re-elected mayor of Lille, socialist Martine Aubry, tried to impose a new €800 million stadium in the eastern part of the community, which was opposed by three major mayors of her own party, who considered the project as misplaced and too expensive.

On January 1, 2015, the métropole replaced the urban community in accordance with a law of January 2014. On January 1, 2017, the number of municipalities of the métropole increased from 85 to 90. It was expanded with the 5 communes of the former Communauté de communes de la Haute Deûle on March 14, 2020.

== Responsibilities ==
=== Local public transport ===
The metropolitan community is responsible for the co-ordination of Ilévia (formerly Transpole), the private-sector company that operates a public transport network throughout the métropole. The network comprises buses, trams and a driverless metro system, all of which are operated under the Ilévia name. The Lille Metro is a VAL system (véhicule automatique léger = light automated vehicle) that opened on April 25, 1983, becoming the first automatic metro line in the world. The metro system has two lines, with a total length of 45 km and 60 stations. The tram system consists of two interurban tram lines, connecting central Lille to the nearby communities of Roubaix and Tourcoing, and has 45 stops. 68 urban bus routes cover the metropolis, 8 of which reach into Belgium.

== Cross-border cooperation ==
The MEL metropolitan community encompasses only the French part of the urban area around Lille; the other part is on Belgian territory and outside the scope of MEL.

The Eurometropolis Lille–Kortrijk–Tournai is a transnational structure founded on January 28, 2008 to overcome this problem, crossing borders and connecting Lille with the nearby Belgian cities Kortrijk, Mouscron and Tournai.

== Communes ==
Métropole Européenne de Lille consists of the following 95 communes:

1. Allennes-les-Marais
2. Annœullin
3. Anstaing
4. Armentières
5. Aubers
6. Baisieux
7. La Bassée
8. Bauvin
9. Beaucamps-Ligny
10. Bois-Grenier
11. Bondues
12. Bousbecque
13. Bouvines
14. Capinghem
15. Carnin
16. La Chapelle-d'Armentières
17. Chéreng
18. Comines
19. Croix
20. Deûlémont
21. Don
22. Emmerin
23. Englos
24. Ennetières-en-Weppes
25. Erquinghem-le-Sec
26. Erquinghem-Lys
27. Escobecques
28. Faches-Thumesnil
29. Forest-sur-Marque
30. Fournes-en-Weppes
31. Frelinghien
32. Fretin
33. Fromelles
34. Gruson
35. Hallennes-lez-Haubourdin
36. Halluin
37. Hantay
38. Haubourdin
39. Hem
40. Herlies
41. Houplin-Ancoisne
42. Houplines
43. Illies
44. Lambersart
45. Lannoy
46. Le Maisnil
47. Leers
48. Lesquin
49. Lezennes
50. Lille
51. Linselles
52. Lompret
53. Loos
54. Lys-lez-Lannoy
55. La Madeleine
56. Marcq-en-Barœul
57. Marquette-lez-Lille
58. Marquillies
59. Mons-en-Barœul
60. Mouvaux
61. Neuville-en-Ferrain
62. Noyelles-lès-Seclin
63. Pérenchies
64. Péronne-en-Mélantois
65. Prémesques
66. Provin
67. Quesnoy-sur-Deûle
68. Radinghem-en-Weppes
69. Ronchin
70. Roncq
71. Roubaix
72. Sailly-lez-Lannoy
73. Sainghin-en-Mélantois
74. Sainghin-en-Weppes
75. Saint-André-lez-Lille
76. Salomé
77. Santes
78. Seclin
79. Sequedin
80. Templemars
81. Toufflers
82. Tourcoing
83. Tressin
84. Vendeville
85. Verlinghem
86. Villeneuve-d'Ascq
87. Wambrechies
88. Warneton
89. Wasquehal
90. Wattignies
91. Wattrelos
92. Wavrin
93. Wervicq-Sud
94. Wicres
95. Willems
