= Canton of Annœullin =

Coordinates: 50.53°N 2.93°E

The canton of Annœullin is an administrative division of the Nord department, northern France. It was created at the French canton reorganisation which came into effect in March 2015. Its seat is in Annœullin.

It consists of the following communes:

1. Allennes-les-Marais
2. Annœullin
3. Aubers
4. La Bassée
5. Bauvin
6. Camphin-en-Carembault
7. Carnin
8. Don
9. Fournes-en-Weppes
10. Fromelles
11. Hantay
12. Herlies
13. Illies
14. Le Maisnil
15. Marquillies
16. Ostricourt
17. Phalempin
18. Provin
19. Radinghem-en-Weppes
20. Sainghin-en-Weppes
21. Salomé
22. Wahagnies
23. Wavrin
24. Wicres
