= Radinghem-en-Weppes =

- Commune
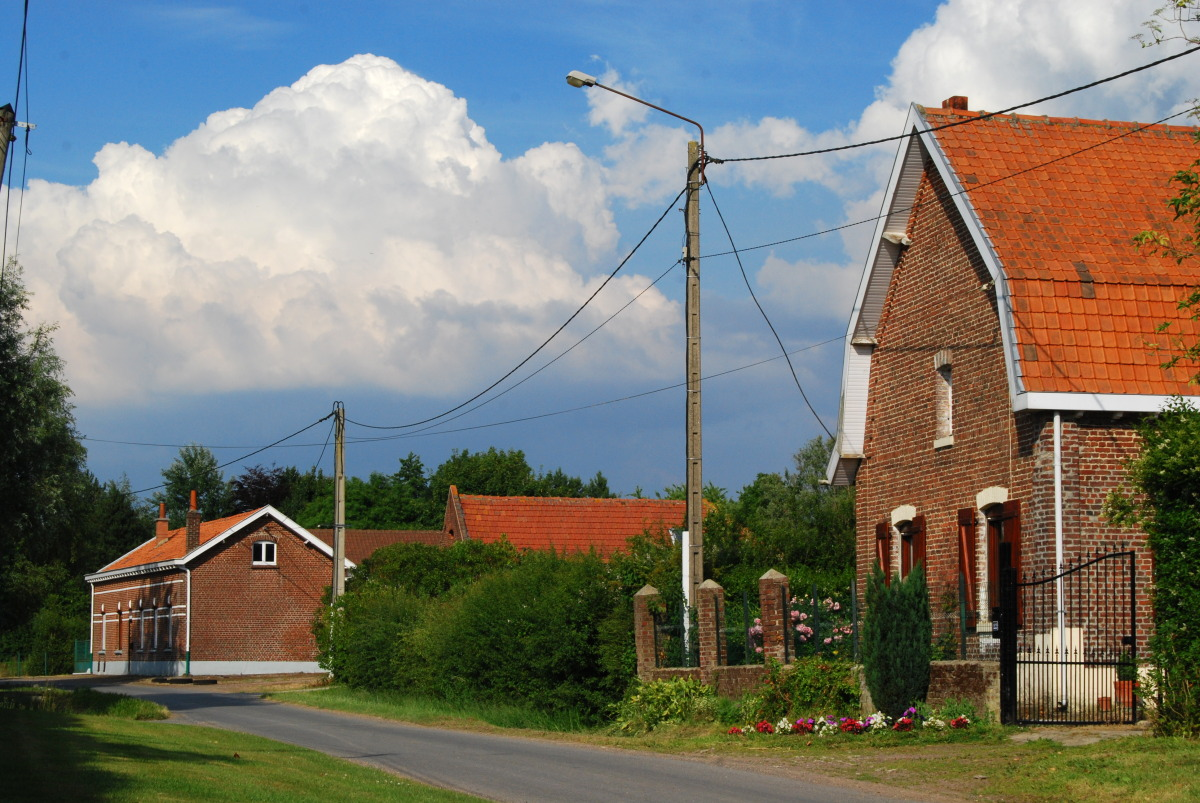
- A view within Radinghem-en-Weppes

- Coat of arms
- Location of Radinghem-en-Weppes
- Location within France Location within Hauts-de-France
- Coordinates: 50°37′32″N 2°54′21″E
- Country: France
- Region: Hauts-de-France
- Department: Nord
- Arrondissement: Lille
- Canton: Annœullin
- Intercommunality: Métropole Européenne de Lille

Government
  - Mayor (2020–2026): Loïc Wolfcarius
- Area^{1}: 6.82 km^{2} (2.63 sq mi)
- Elevation: 17 m (56 ft)
- Population (2023): 1,410
  - Density: 207/km^{2} (535/sq mi)
- Time zone: UTC+01:00 (CET)
  - Summer (DST): UTC+02:00 (CEST)
- INSEE/Postal code: 59487 /59320
- ^{1} French Land Register data, which excludes lakes, ponds, glaciers > 1 km^{2} (0.386 sq mi or 247 acres) and river estuaries.

Radinghem-en-Weppes (French pronunciation: [ʁadɛ̃ɡɛm ɑ̃ wɛp]) is a commune in the Nord department in northern France.

== Heraldry ==
Arms of Isigny-sur-Mer	The arms of Isigny-sur-Mer are blazoned : Or, a chevron between 3 mullets of six points sable, on the point of the chevron an inescutcheon Or charged with a lion sable, armed and langued gules.

== See also ==
- Communes of the Nord department
