= Herlies =

- Commune
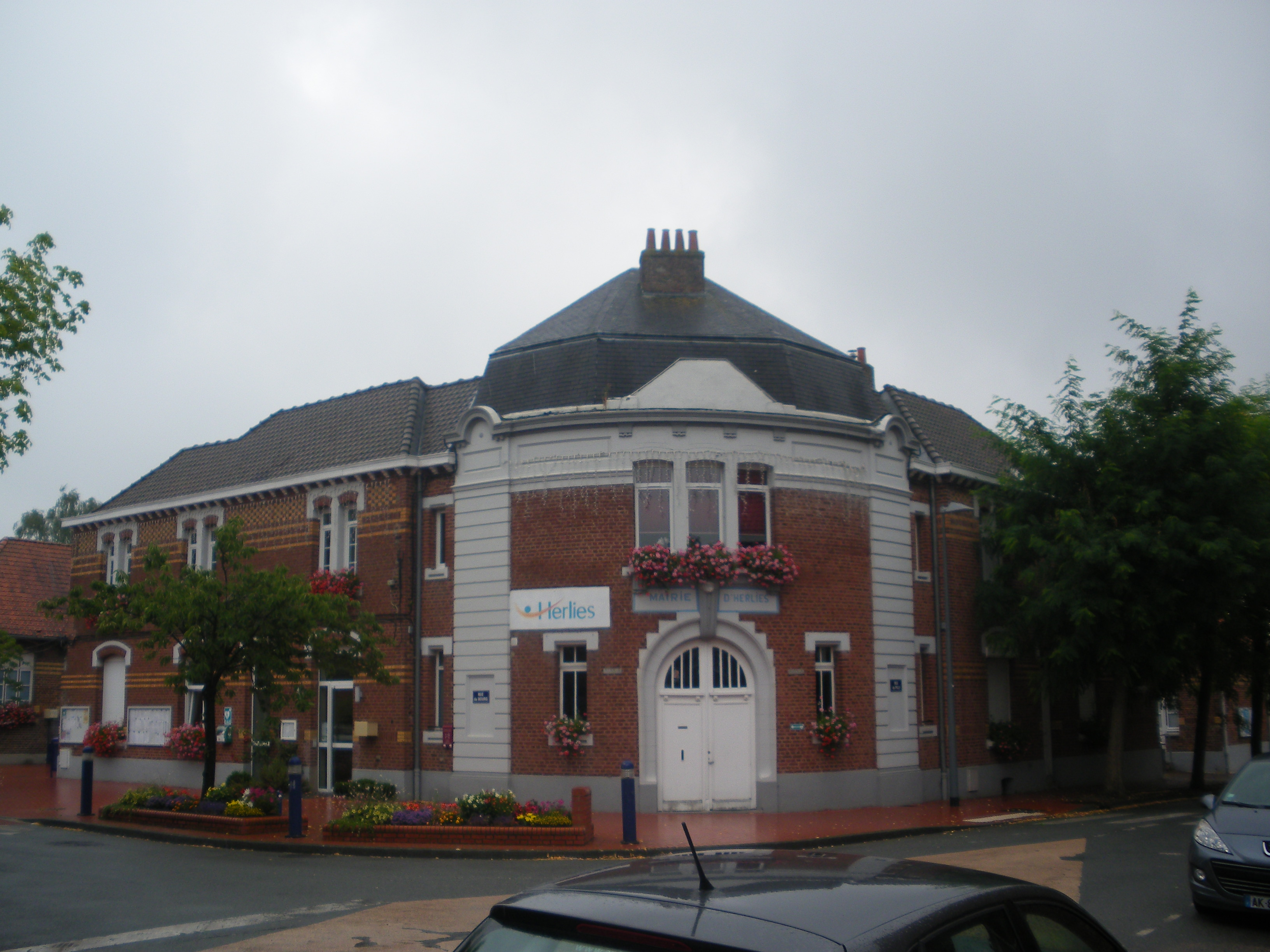
- The town hall in Herlies

- Coat of arms
- Location of Herlies
- Location within France Location within Hauts-de-France
- Coordinates: 50°34′44″N 2°51′18″E
- Country: France
- Region: Hauts-de-France
- Department: Nord
- Arrondissement: Lille
- Canton: Annœullin
- Intercommunality: Métropole Européenne de Lille

Government
  - Mayor (2020–2026): Bernard Debeer
- Area^{1}: 7.11 km^{2} (2.75 sq mi)
- Elevation: 37 m (121 ft)
- Highest elevation: 41 m (135 ft)
- Lowest elevation: 24 m (79 ft)
- Population (2023): 2,267
  - Density: 319/km^{2} (826/sq mi)
- Time zone: UTC+01:00 (CET)
  - Summer (DST): UTC+02:00 (CEST)
- INSEE/Postal code: 59303 /59134
- ^{1} French Land Register data, which excludes lakes, ponds, glaciers > 1 km^{2} (0.386 sq mi or 247 acres) and river estuaries.

Herlies (French pronunciation: [ɛʁli]) is a commune in the Nord department in northern France. It is part of the Métropole Européenne de Lille.

== Population ==
Historical population
Year	Pop.	±% p.a.
1968	805	—
1975	814	+0.16%
1982	1,236	+6.15%
1990	1,697	+4.04%
1999	2,015	+1.93%
2007	2,059	+0.27%
2012	2,225	+1.56%
2017	2,399	+1.52%
2023	2,267	−0.94%
Source: INSEE

== Heraldry ==
Arms of Herlies	The arms of Herlies are blazoned : Azure, 3 fleurs de lys, in chief a label of three points Or.

== See also ==
- Communes of the Nord department
