= Marquillies =

- Commune
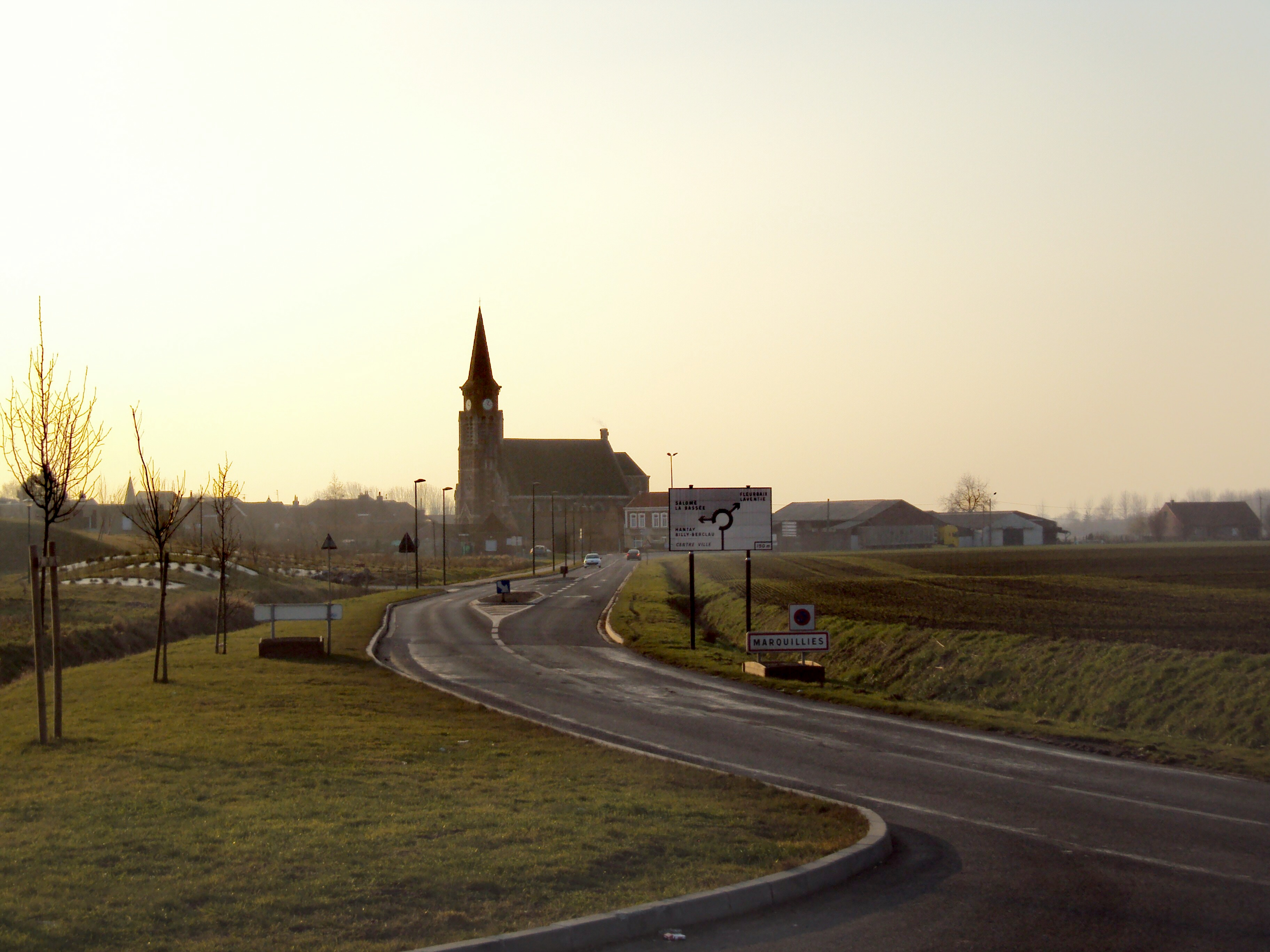
- A general view of Marquillies

- Coat of arms
- Location of Marquillies
- Location within France Location within Hauts-de-France
- Coordinates: 50°33′24″N 2°52′17″E
- Country: France
- Region: Hauts-de-France
- Department: Nord
- Arrondissement: Lille
- Canton: Annœullin
- Intercommunality: Métropole Européenne de Lille

Government
  - Mayor (2025–2026): Eric Bocquet
- Area^{1}: 6.91 km^{2} (2.67 sq mi)
- Elevation: 28 m (92 ft)
- Highest elevation: 33 m (108 ft)
- Lowest elevation: 17 m (56 ft)
- Population (2023): 1,961
  - Density: 284/km^{2} (735/sq mi)
- Time zone: UTC+01:00 (CET)
  - Summer (DST): UTC+02:00 (CEST)
- INSEE/Postal code: 59388 /59274
- ^{1} French Land Register data, which excludes lakes, ponds, glaciers > 1 km^{2} (0.386 sq mi or 247 acres) and river estuaries.

Marquillies (French pronunciation: [maʁkiji]) is a commune in the Nord department in northern France.

== Heraldry ==
Arms of Marquillies	The arms of Marquillies are blazoned : Argent, a fess azure.

== See also ==
- Communes of the Nord department
