= Don, Nord =

Don
- Commune
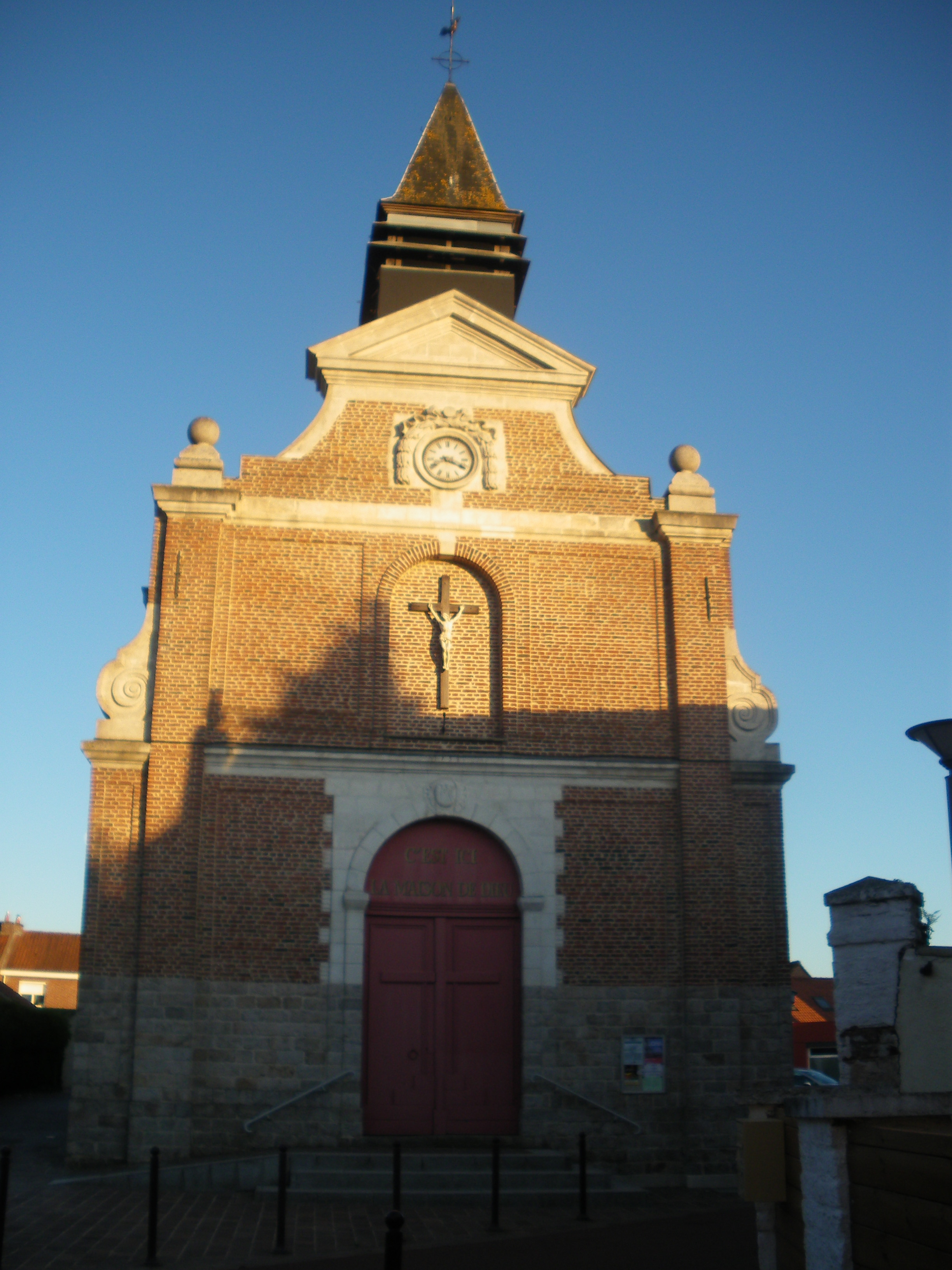
- The church in Don
- Location of Don
- Location within France Location within Hauts-de-France
- Coordinates: 50°32′54″N 2°55′14″E
- Country: France
- Region: Hauts-de-France
- Department: Nord
- Arrondissement: Lille
- Canton: Annœullin
- Intercommunality: Métropole Européenne de Lille

Government
  - Mayor (2020–2026): André-Luc Dubois
- Area^{1}: 2.32 km^{2} (0.90 sq mi)
- Elevation: 20 m (66 ft)
- Highest elevation: 24 m (79 ft)
- Lowest elevation: 18 m (59 ft)
- Population (2023): 1,387
  - Density: 598/km^{2} (1,550/sq mi)
- Time zone: UTC+01:00 (CET)
  - Summer (DST): UTC+02:00 (CEST)
- INSEE/Postal code: 59670 /59272
- ^{1} French Land Register data, which excludes lakes, ponds, glaciers > 1 km^{2} (0.386 sq mi or 247 acres) and river estuaries.

Don (French pronunciation: [dɔ̃]) is a commune in the Nord department in northern France.

== See also ==
- Communes of the Nord department
