= Fournes-en-Weppes =

- Commune
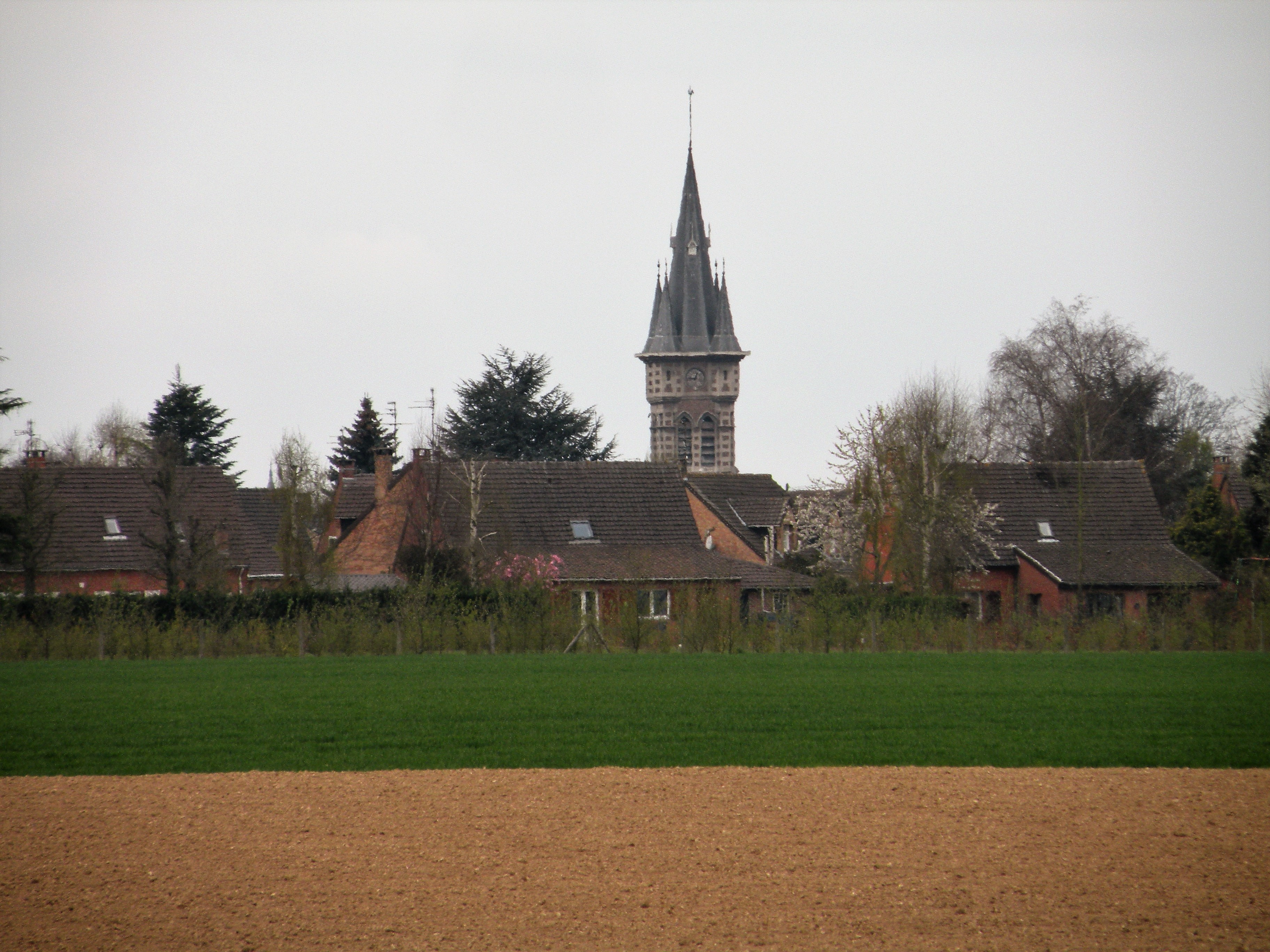
- A general view of Fournes-en-Weppes

- Coat of arms
- Location of Fournes-en-Weppes
- Location within France Location within Hauts-de-France
- Coordinates: 50°35′09″N 2°53′24″E
- Country: France
- Region: Hauts-de-France
- Department: Nord
- Arrondissement: Lille
- Canton: Annœullin
- Intercommunality: Métropole Européenne de Lille

Government
  - Mayor (2020–2026): Marie-José Kramarz
- Area^{1}: 8.22 km^{2} (3.17 sq mi)
- Elevation: 43 m (141 ft)
- Highest elevation: 43 m (141 ft)
- Lowest elevation: 26 m (85 ft)
- Population (2023): 2,179
  - Density: 265/km^{2} (687/sq mi)
- Time zone: UTC+01:00 (CET)
  - Summer (DST): UTC+02:00 (CEST)
- INSEE/Postal code: 59250 /59134
- ^{1} French Land Register data, which excludes lakes, ponds, glaciers > 1 km^{2} (0.386 sq mi or 247 acres) and river estuaries.

Fournes-en-Weppes (French pronunciation: [fuʁn ɑ̃ wɛp], before 1962: Fournes) is a commune in the Nord department in northern France. It is part of the Métropole Européenne de Lille. Hitler spent nearly half of his wartime service in World War I here.

== Population ==
Historical population
Year	Pop.	±% p.a.
1968	1,455	—
1975	1,394	−0.61%
1982	1,740	+3.22%
1990	1,925	+1.27%
1999	2,009	+0.48%
2007	1,965	−0.28%
2012	2,126	+1.59%
2017	2,220	+0.87%
2023	2,179	−0.31%
Source: INSEE

== Heraldry ==
Arms of Fournes-en-Weppes	The arms of Fournes-en-Weppes are blazoned : Bendy argent and gules. (La Flamengrie, Fournes-en-Weppes and Wargnies-le-Grand use the same arms.)

== See also ==
- Communes of the Nord department
