= Aubers =

- Commune
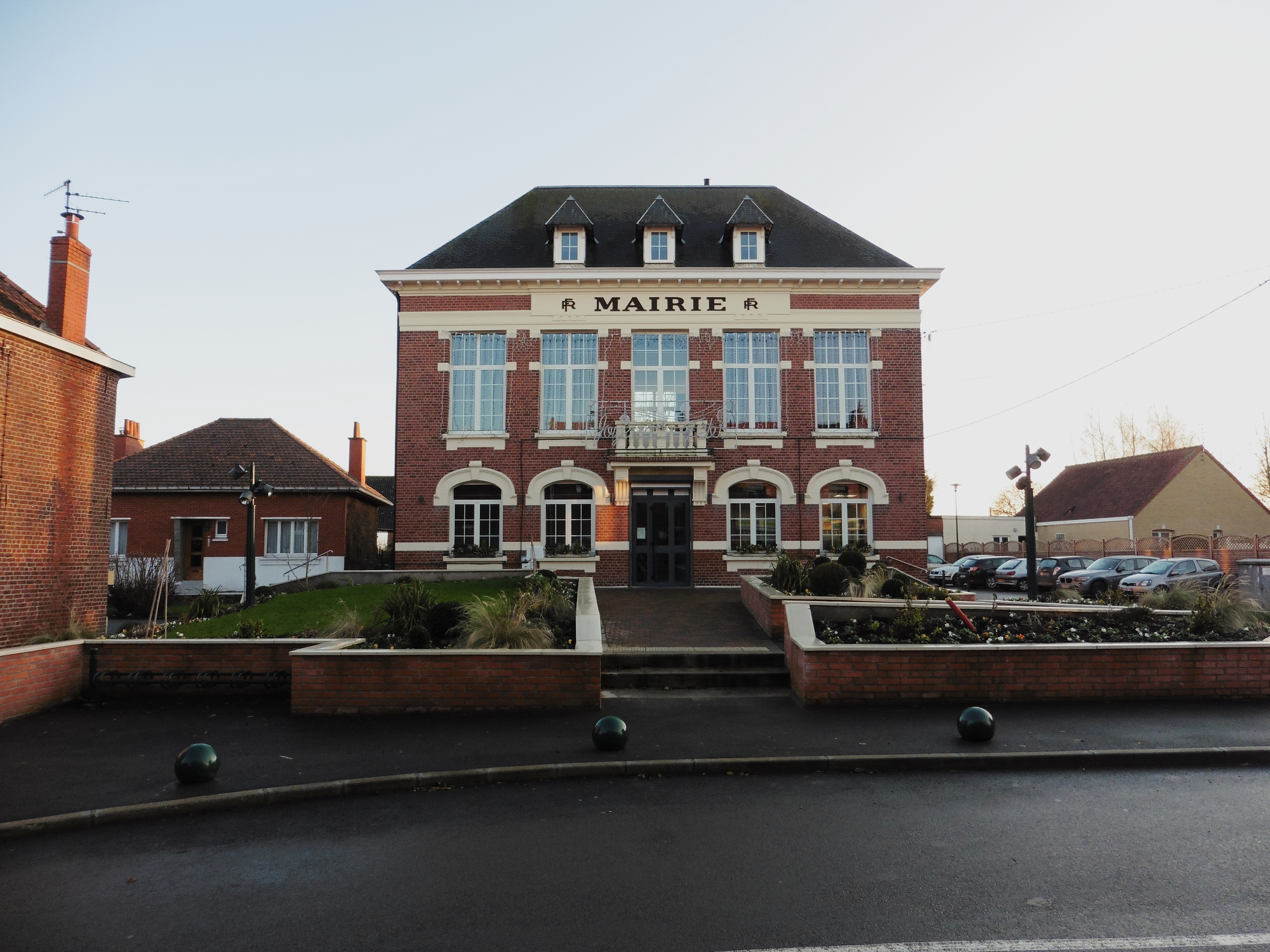
- The town hall in Aubers

- Coat of arms
- Location of Aubers
- Location within France Location within Hauts-de-France
- Coordinates: 50°35′46″N 2°49′33″E
- Country: France
- Region: Hauts-de-France
- Department: Nord
- Arrondissement: Lille
- Canton: Annœullin
- Intercommunality: Métropole Européenne de Lille

Government
  - Mayor (2020–2026): Alain Leclercq
- Area^{1}: 10.14 km^{2} (3.92 sq mi)
- Elevation: 29 m (95 ft)
- Highest elevation: 41 m (135 ft)
- Lowest elevation: 18 m (59 ft)
- Population (2023): 1,749
  - Density: 172.5/km^{2} (446.7/sq mi)
- Time zone: UTC+01:00 (CET)
  - Summer (DST): UTC+02:00 (CEST)
- INSEE/Postal code: 59025 /59249
- ^{1} French Land Register data, which excludes lakes, ponds, glaciers > 1 km^{2} (0.386 sq mi or 247 acres) and river estuaries.

Aubers (French pronunciation: [obɛʁ]) is a commune in the Nord department in northern France. It is 15 km (9.3 mi) west of Lille. The parish church is dedicated to St Vaast.

It was the site of a major World War I battle, the Battle of Aubers, during 1915.

Aubers is twinned with the English town of Wadhurst.

== Population ==
Historical population
Year	Pop.	±% p.a.
1968	891	—
1975	908	+0.27%
1982	1,311	+5.39%
1990	1,571	+2.29%
1999	1,584	+0.09%
2007	1,521	−0.51%
2012	1,537	+0.21%
2017	1,651	+1.44%
2023	1,749	+0.97%
Source: INSEE

== Heraldry ==
Arms of Aubers	The arms of Aubers are blazoned : Gules, a cross Or.

== See also ==
- Communes of the Nord department
