= Illies, Nord =

Illies
- Commune
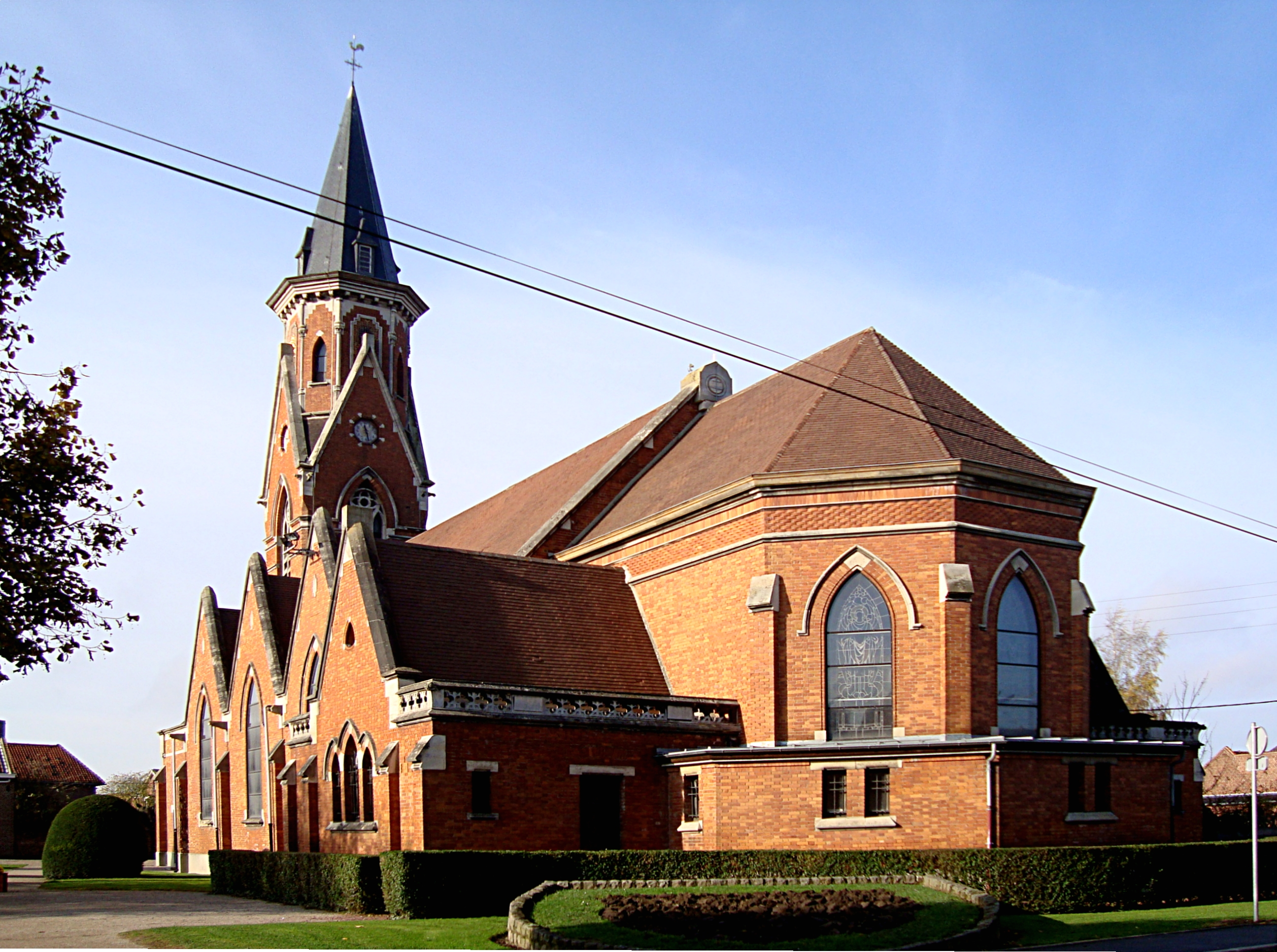
- The church in Illies

- Coat of arms
- Location of Illies
- Location within France Location within Hauts-de-France
- Coordinates: 50°33′43″N 2°49′55″E
- Country: France
- Region: Hauts-de-France
- Department: Nord
- Arrondissement: Lille
- Canton: Annœullin
- Intercommunality: Métropole Européenne de Lille

Government
  - Mayor (2022–2026): Damien Hayart
- Area^{1}: 7.91 km^{2} (3.05 sq mi)
- Elevation: 25 m (82 ft)
- Highest elevation: 41 m (135 ft)
- Lowest elevation: 20 m (66 ft)
- Population (2023): 1,712
  - Density: 216/km^{2} (561/sq mi)
- Time zone: UTC+01:00 (CET)
  - Summer (DST): UTC+02:00 (CEST)
- INSEE/Postal code: 59320 /59480
- ^{1} French Land Register data, which excludes lakes, ponds, glaciers > 1 km^{2} (0.386 sq mi or 247 acres) and river estuaries.

Illies (French pronunciation: [ili]) is a commune in the Nord department in northern France.

== Heraldry ==
Arms of Illies	The arms of Illies are blazoned : Azure, 7 bezants (3,3,1) and a chief Or. (Clary and Illies use the same arms.)

== See also ==
- Communes of the Nord department
