= List of legislative constituencies of the Nord department =

France is divided into 577 constituencies (circonscriptions) for the election of deputies to the lower legislative House, the National Assembly (539 in Metropolitan France, 27 in the overseas departments and territories, and 11 for French residents overseas). Deputies are elected in a two-round system to a term fixed to a maximum of five years. The department of Nord has 21 Members of Parliament.

Legislative Constituencies of the Nord Department

== List ==
Constituency	Member	Party
Nord's 1st constituency	Aurélien Le Coq	La France Insoumise
Nord's 2nd constituency	Ugo Bernalicis	La France Insoumise
Nord's 3rd constituency	Sandra Delannoy	National Rally
Nord's 4th constituency	Brigitte Liso	Renaissance
Nord's 5th constituency	Sébastien Huyghe	Renaissance
Nord's 6th constituency	Charlotte Lecocq	Renaissance
Nord's 7th constituency	Félicie Gérard	Horizons
Nord's 8th constituency	David Guiraud	La France Insoumise
Nord's 9th constituency	Violette Spillebout	Renaissance
Nord's 10th constituency	Vincent Ledoux	Agir
Nord's 11th constituency	Roger Vicot	Socialist Party
Nord's 12th constituency	Michaël Taverne	National Rally
Nord's 13th constituency	Christine Decodts	DVC
Nord's 14th constituency	Paul Christophe	Agir
Nord's 15th constituency	Pierrick Berteloot	National Rally
Nord's 16th constituency	Matthieu Marchio	National Rally
Nord's 17th constituency	Thibaut François	National Rally
Nord's 18th constituency	Alexandre Dufosset	National Rally
Nord's 19th constituency	Sébastien Chenu	National Rally
Nord's 20th constituency	Guillaume Florquin	National Rally
Nord's 21st constituency	Valérie Létard	Union of Democrats and Independents
