= Valérie Petit =

French politician

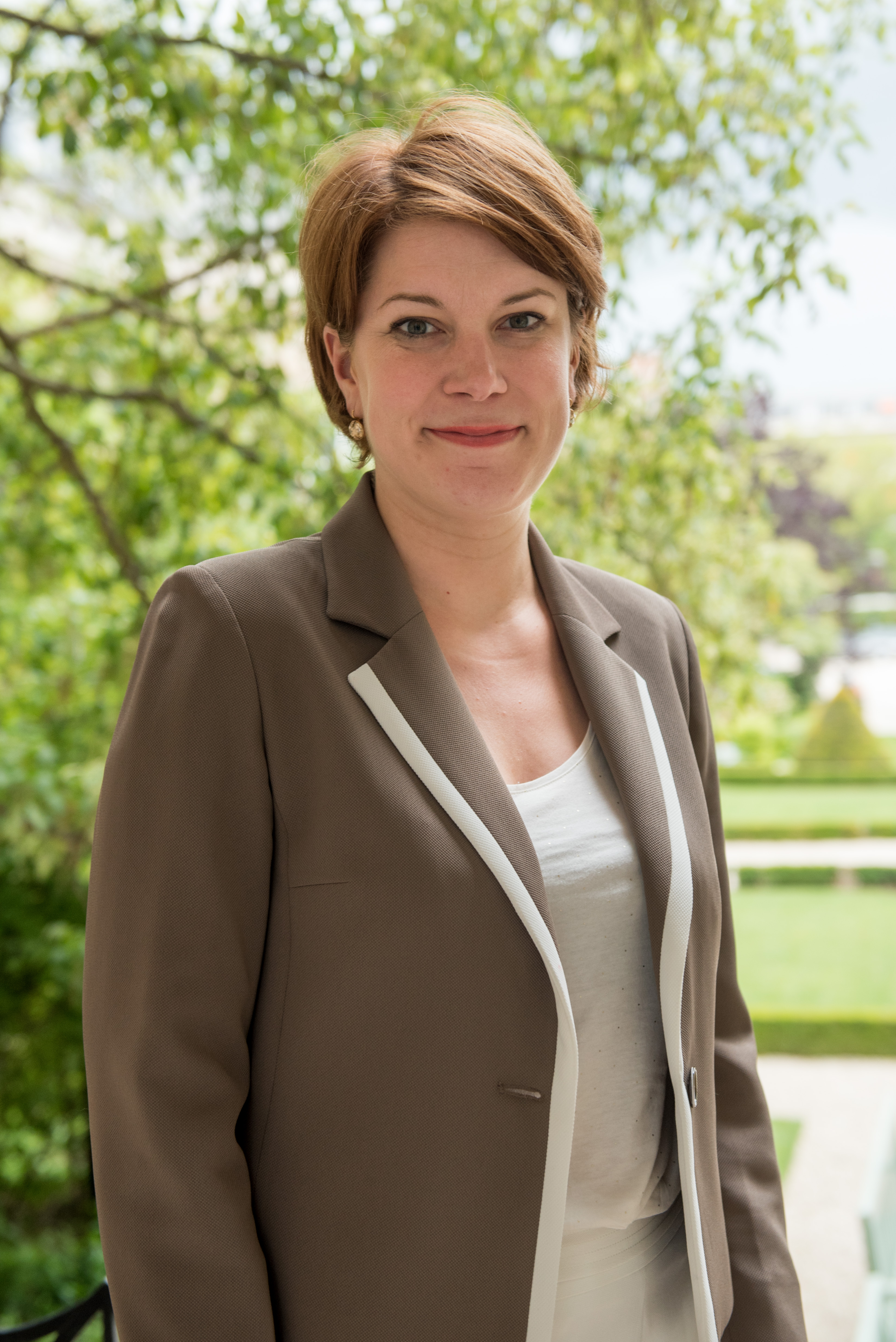

Member of the National Assembly for Nord's 9th constituency
- In office 21 June 2017 – 21 June 2022
- Preceded by: Bernard Gérard
- Succeeded by: Violette Spillebout

Personal details
- Born: 23 June 1976 (age 50) Meaux, France
- Party: Agir, La République En Marche! (2016-2020)
- Education: Sciences Po Lille; Conservatoire national des arts et métiers

Valérie Petit (born 23 June 1976) is a French politician who served as a member of the French National Assembly from 2017 elections until 2022, representing the 9th constituency of the department of Nord. From 2016 until 2020, she was a member of La République En Marche! (LREM).

In parliament, Petit served on the Finance Committee. In early 2020, Petit left LREM. She sat with the Agir ensemble group in the Parliament.

== See also ==
- 2017 French legislative election
