= Alexandre Basquin =

French politician (born 1981)

Member of the Senate
- Incumbent
- Assumed office 1 November 2024
- Preceded by: Éric Bocquet
- Constituency: Nord

Personal details
- Born: 21 September 1981 (age 44)
- Party: French Communist Party

Alexandre Basquin (born 21 September 1981) is a French politician serving as a member of the Senate since 2024. From 2014 to 2024, he served as mayor of Avesnes-les-Aubert.

== Biography ==
From 2010 to 2018, Alexandre Basquin was the organizational secretary of the Northern Federation of the French Communist Party (PCF), which was then led by Fabien Roussel.

In the 2011 cantonal elections, he was the Front de gauche candidate for the canton of Carnières, coming fourth with 15.44% of the votes cast. In the 2015 departmental elections, he stood for the same party in the new Canton of Caudry, coming fourth with 11.62% of the votes cast.

Elected mayor of Avesnes-les-Aubert in 2014, a municipality of 3,600 inhabitants in the Cambrésis region, he has also been fourth vice-president of the Caudrésis Urban Community since April 17, 2014. - Catésis, responsible for Housing, Unsanitary Conditions, and the Local Housing Plan, a position he held from 2017 to 2020. After that date, his portfolios were reduced to Housing.

He succeeded Éric Bocquet as senator for the Nord department following the latter's resignation, who wanted to “prepare for the future and bring in the next generation.”

He was his predecessor's parliamentary aide during his thirteen years in national office.

He is a member of the Communist Party and sits on the Communist, Republican, Citizen and Ecologist group.

After Second inauguration of Donald Trump, Alexandre Basquin made headlines by calling for a mass exodus from social media in an open letter addressed to ministers, parliamentarians, the media, and all citizens.
