= Alain Bruneel =

French politician (born 1952)

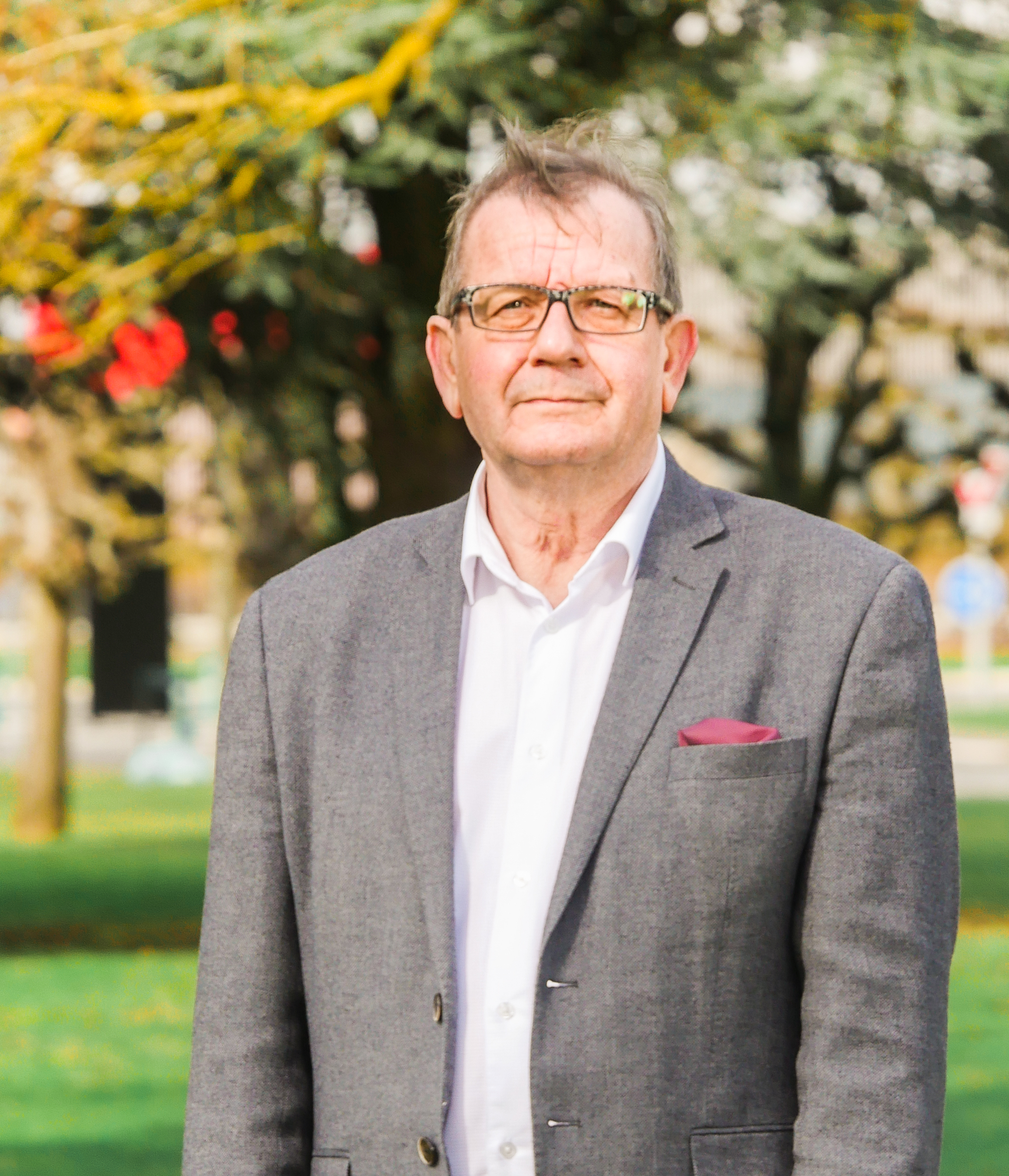

Member of the French National Assembly for Nord's 16th constituency
- In office 21 June 2017 – 22 June 2022
- Preceded by: Jean-Jacques Candelier
- Succeeded by: Matthieu Marchio

Personal details
- Born: 7 March 1952 (age 74) Tourcoing, France
- Party: French Communist Party

Alain Bruneel (born 7 March 1952 in Tourcoing) is a French politician. A member of the Communist Party (PCF), he represented Nord's 16th constituency in the French National Assembly from 2017 until 2022.

== Career ==
He has been the mayor of Lewarde (Nord department) since 1999.

He was elected a regional councillor in 2004 and 2010. In 2011, he was elected a Nord general councillor from the canton of Douai-Sud and resigned from the regional council to avoid holding multiple offices; he gave his seat to Christophe di Pompeo.

He was elected to the French National Assembly on 18 June 2017, representing the 16th constituency of Nord.
