= Éric Bocquet =

French politician

Member of the French Senate for Nord
- In office 1 October 2011 – 1 November 2024
- Succeeded by: Alexandre Basquin

Personal details
- Born: 8 November 1957 (age 68) France
- Party: PCF
- Relatives: Alain Bocquet (brother)
- Profession: English teacher

Éric Bocquet (born 8 November 1957) is a French politician and member of the French Communist Party.

== Biography ==
Elected Marquillies mayor in 1995, he was re-elected every following municipal poll ever since. He is also communal advisor of the Lille Metropole urban Community. On the occasion of the French legislative elections of 2007, he submitted his candidacy to the Nord's 11th constituency but was eliminated following the first round with 5,61 % of votes.

During the Senate elections of 2011, he was elected top of the Nord department Communist Party list and became Nord Senator on 25 September 2011.

Éric Bocquet is the brother of Alain Bocquet, Nord deputy and Saint-Amand-les-Eaux mayor.

== Tenures ==
Senator

- Since 1 October 2011: Nord Senator

Municipal advisor / Mayor

- 25 June 1995 – 18 March 2001: Marquillies mayor
- March 2001 – 16 March 2008: Marquillies mayor
- Since 16 March 2008: Marquillies mayor

== Annexes ==
=== Related articles ===
- Nord Senators list

=== External links ===
- French Senate - Eric Bocquet's biography
