= Victor Catteau =

French politician (born 1995)

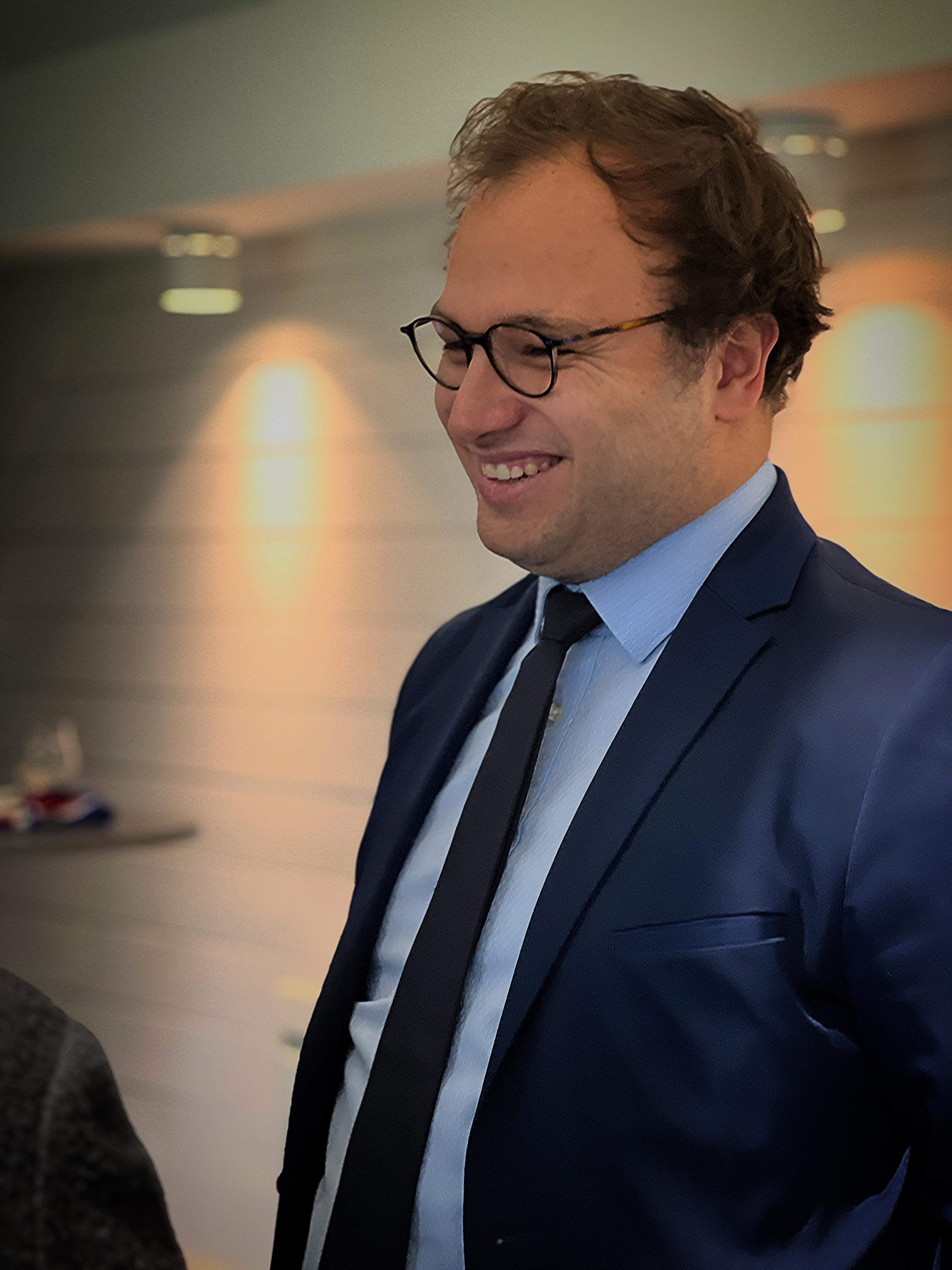

Member of the National Assembly for Nord's 5th constituency
- In office 22 June 2022 – 9 June 2024
- Preceded by: Sébastien Huyghe
- Succeeded by: Sébastien Huyghe

Personal details
- Born: 18 September 1995 (age 30)
- Party: National Rally

Victor Catteau (French pronunciation: [viktɔʁ kato]; born 18 September 1995) is a French politician from the National Rally who was elected member of the National Assembly for Nord's 5th constituency in the 2022 French legislative election.

== See also ==
- List of deputies of the 16th National Assembly of France
