= Arrondissements of the Nord department (France) =

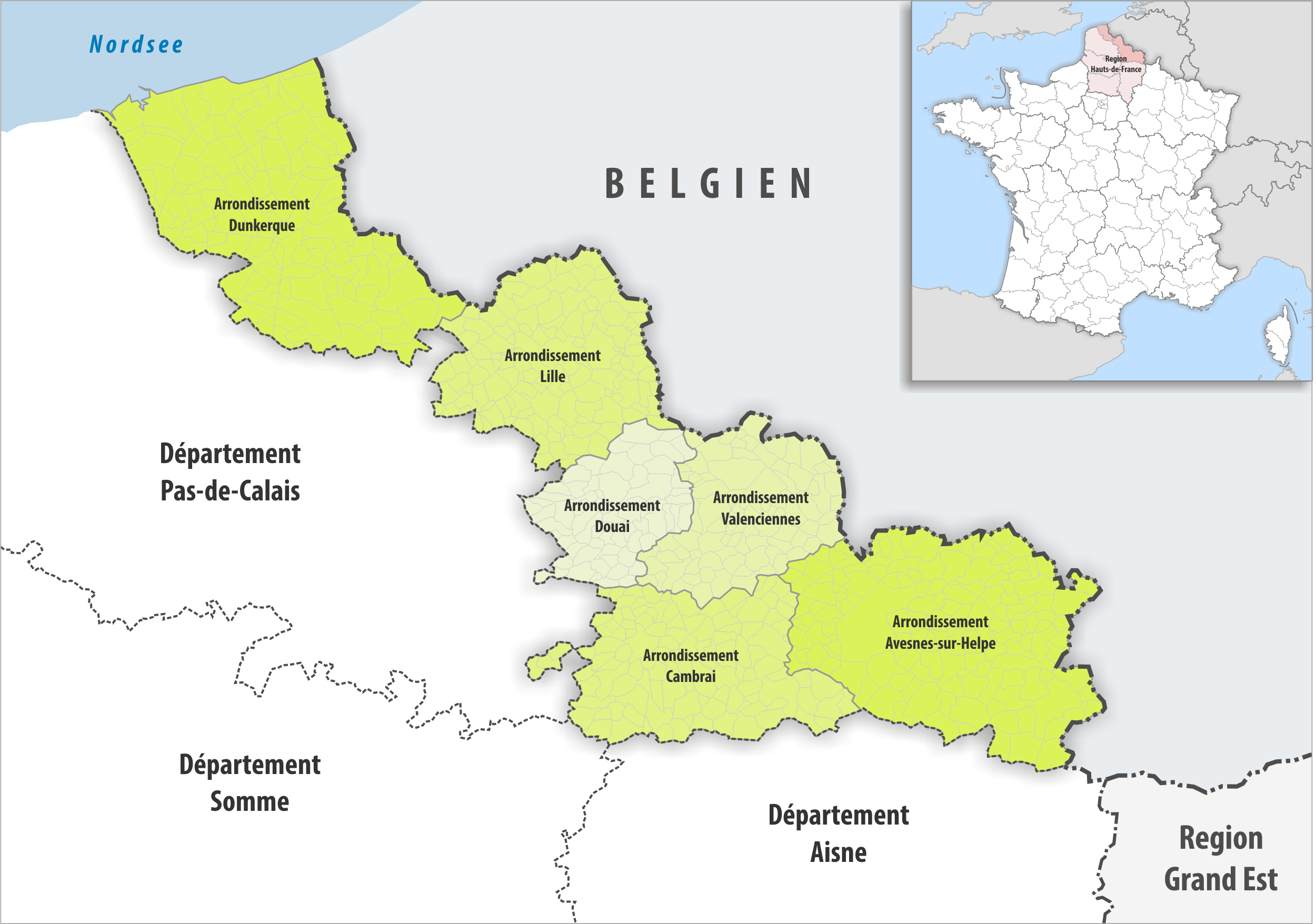
Map of arrondissements of the Nord department.

The 6 arrondissements of the Nord department are:

1. Arrondissement of Avesnes-sur-Helpe, (subprefecture: Avesnes-sur-Helpe) with 151 communes. Its population was 225,391 in 2021.
2. Arrondissement of Cambrai, (subprefecture: Cambrai) with 116 communes. Its population was 158,753 in 2021.
3. Arrondissement of Douai, (subprefecture: Douai) with 64 communes. Its population was 244,710 in 2021.
4. Arrondissement of Dunkirk (Dunkerque), (subprefecture: Dunkirk) with 111 communes. Its population was 371,736 in 2021.
5. Arrondissement of Lille, (prefecture of the Nord department: Lille) with 124 communes. Its population was 1,260,060 in 2021.
6. Arrondissement of Valenciennes, (subprefecture: Valenciennes) with 82 communes. Its population was 350,643 in 2021.

== History ==
In 1800 the arrondissements of Douai, Avesnes, Bergues, Cambrai, Cassel, Lille and Valenciennes were established. In 1803 Dunkirk replaced Bergues as subprefecture. Lille replaced Douai as prefecture in 1804. In 1824 the arrondissement of Valenciennes was created. In 1857 Hazebrouck replaced Cassel as subprefecture. The arrondissement of Hazebrouck was disbanded in 1926.
