= Nord's 14th constituency =

Constituency of the National Assembly of France

14th constituency of the Nord
- inline Constituency of the National Assembly of France

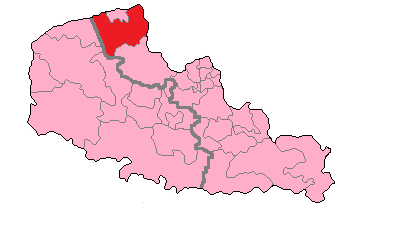
- Nord's 14th Constituency shown within Nord-Pas-de-Calais
- Deputy: Paul Christophe; Agir
- Department: Nord
- Cantons: Bergues, Bourbourg, Dunkerque-Est, Gravelines, Hondschoote, Wormhout
- Registered voters: 98,795

The 14th constituency of the Nord is a French legislative constituency in the Nord département.

== Description ==
Nord's 14th constituency entirely surrounds Nord's 13th constituency and includes the eastern half of Dunkerque along with most of the coastal strip along the English Channel of the department.

Despite being held by the French Communist Party between 1962 and 1986 the seat has since then been held mostly by conservatives.

== Historic Representation ==
Election	Member	Party
1958	Carlos Dolez	MRP
1962	Henri Martel	PCF
1967	Émile Roger	PCF
1968	Émile Roger	PCF
1973	Émile Roger	PCF
1978	Émile Roger	PCF
1981	Émile Roger	PCF
1986	Proportional representation - no election by constituency	
1988	Charles Paccou	RPR
1993	Gabriel Deblock	DVD
1997	Monique Denise	PS
2002	Jean-Pierre Decool	UMP
2007	Jean-Pierre Decool	UMP
2012	Jean-Pierre Decool	UMP
2017	Paul Christophe	LR
2017	Paul Christophe	Agir
2022	Paul Christophe	Agir

== Election results ==
=== 2024 ===
Legislative Election 2024: Nord's 14th constituency
Party	Candidate	Votes	%	±%
DIV	Anne-Lise Perche	1,033	1.59	n/a
LFI (NFP)	Philippine Heyman	8,876	13.63	−3.40
LR (UXD)	Jean-Baptiste Gardes	30,194	46.37	+35.69
LO	Sandrine Desreyaud	1,091	1.68	n/a
HOR (Ensemble)	Paul Christophe	23,928	36.74	+2.99
Turnout		65,122	97.25	+49.55
Registered electors		99,449		
2nd round result
HOR	Paul Christophe	32,303	50.15	+13.41
LR	Jean-Baptiste Gardes	32,114	49.85	+3.48
Turnout		64,417	96.46	−0.79
Registered electors		99,40		
HOR hold		Swing		

=== 2022 ===
Legislative Election 2022: Nord's 14th constituency
Party	Candidate	Votes	%	±%
Agir (Ensemble)	Paul Christophe	15,582	33.75	+8.31
RN	Pierrette Cuvelier	13,032	28.23	+7.93
LFI (NUPÉS)	Philippine Heyman	7,861	17.03	−4.59
LR (UDC)	Frédéric Devos	4,931	10.68	−15.99
REC	Eric Maerten	1,809	3.92	N/A
PA	Frédéric Béague	1,349	2.92	N/A
Others	N/A	1,605	3.48	
Turnout		46,169	47.70	−3.05
2nd round result
Agir (Ensemble)	Paul Christophe	22,916	53.21	+17.09
RN	Pierrette Cuvelier	20,154	46.97	N/A
Turnout		43,070	46.35	+1.90
Agir gain from LR				

=== 2017 ===
Candidate	Label	First round		Second round	
Candidate	Label	Votes	%	Votes	%
Paul Christophe	LR	13,004	26.67	25,162	63.88
Julien Lemaitte	REM	12,407	25.44	14,229	36.12
Yohann Duval	FN	9,898	20.30		
Delphine Decoster	FI	5,853	12.00		
Christian Devos	PS	2,634	5.40		
Myriam Santhune	ECO	1,584	3.25		
Sylvie Brachet	PRG	1,074	2.20		
Jean-Paul Tisserand	EXD	878	1.80		
David Haillant	EXG	644	1.32		
Nathalie Benalla	PCF	471	0.97		
Stéphane Dumont	DIV	320	0.66		
Votes		48,767	100.00	39,391	100.00
Valid votes		48,767	97.28	39,391	89.71
Blank votes		952	1.90	3,074	7.00
Null votes		414	0.83	1,446	3.29
Turnout		50,133	50.75	43,911	44.45
Abstentions		48,660	49.25	54,871	55.55
Registered voters		98,793		98,782	
Source: Ministry of the Interior

=== 2012 ===
Legislative Election 2012: Nord's 14th constituency
Party	Candidate	Votes	%	±%
UMP	Jean-Pierre Decool	23,015	39.16	
PS	Jean Schepman	21,496	36.58	
FG	Delphine Castelli	1,642	2.79	
EELV	José Szymaniak	1,368	2.33	
Others	N/A	1,300		
Turnout		58,770	59.48	
2nd round result
UMP	Jean-Pierre Decool	30,703	53.44	
PS	Jean Schepman	26,748	46.56	
Turnout		57,451	58.15	
UMP hold				

=== 2007 ===
Legislative Election 2007: Nord's 14th constituency
Party	Candidate	Votes	%	±%
UMP	Jean-Pierre Decool	26,555	56.67	
PRG	Francis Bassemon	7,913	16.89	
MoDem	Séverine Potvin-Belet	2,531	5.40	
FN	Roger Lessieux	2,365	5.05	
Far left	Marie Bouzat	1,932	4.12	
LV	Laurence Hugues	1,407	3.00	
CPNT	Daneil Wexsteen	1,276	2.72	
Far left	David Dupuich	1,008	2.15	
Others	N/A	1,868		
Turnout		48,099	64.86	
UMP hold				

=== 2002 ===
Legislative Election 2002: Nord's 14th constituency
Party	Candidate	Votes	%	±%
UMP	Jean-Pierre Decool	20,407	42.91	
PS	Monique Denise	13,777	28.97	
FN	Didier Lejeune	5,797	12.19	
CPNT	Eric Delautre	2,367	4.98	
Others	N/A	5,207		
Turnout		48,823	68.35	
2nd round result
UMP	Jean-Pierre Decool	26,776	58.09	
PS	Monique Denise	19,319	41.91	
Turnout		48,085	67.32	
UMP gain from PS				

=== 1997 ===
Legislative Election 1997: Nord's 14th constituency
Party	Candidate	Votes	%	±%
RPR	Jean-Pierre Decool	16,712	35.08	
PS	Monique Denise	14,487	30.41	
FN	Yannick Le Floch	7,266	15.25	
PCF	Guillaume Dochez	2,783	5.84	
LV	Alain Tredez	1,887	3.96	
DVD	Philippe Peene	1,820	3.82	
Others	N/A	2,683		
Turnout		50,979	76.16	
2nd round result
PS	Monique Denise	25,090	50.49	
RPR	Jean-Pierre Decool	24,604	49.51	
Turnout		53,037	79.24	
PS gain from DVD				

== Sources ==
- Official results of French elections from 1998: "Résultats électoraux officiels en France" (in French).
