= Nord's 16th constituency =

Constituency of the National Assembly of France

16th constituency of the Nord
- inline Constituency of the National Assembly of France

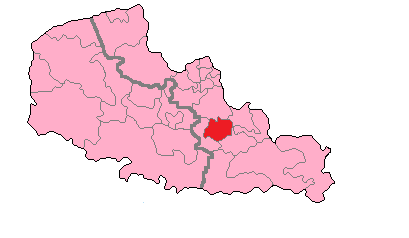
- Nord's 16th Constituency shown within Nord-Pas-de-Calais
- Deputy: Matthieu Marchio; RN
- Department: Nord
- Cantons: Marchiennes, Douai-Nord (part), communes d'Aniche, Auberchicourt, Dechy, Écaillon, Guesnain, Lewarde, Loffre, Masny et Montigny-en-Ostrevent
- Registered voters: 83,611

The 16th constituency of the Nord is a French legislative constituency in the Nord département.

== Description ==
Nord's 16th constituency sits in the heart of the department around Douai. It was held by the Communist Jean-Jacques Candelier from 2007 to 2017.

== Historic Representation ==
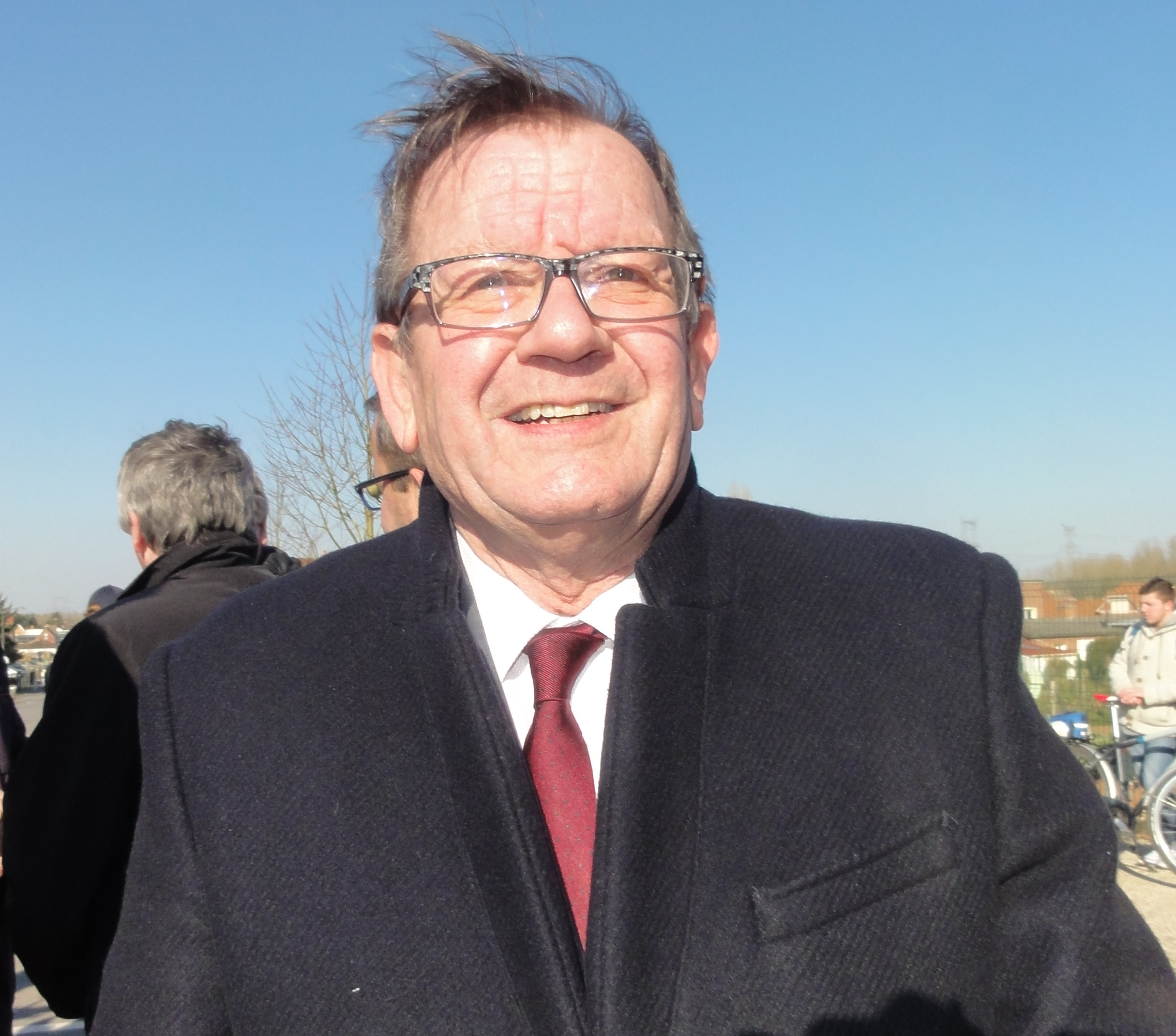
Alain Bruneel (2017–2022).

Election	Member	Party
1958	Raymond Gernez	SFIO
1962	Raymond Gernez	SFIO
1967	Raymond Gernez	FGDS
1968	Raymond Gernez	PS
1973	Jacques Legendre	UDR
1973	Claude Pringalle	UDR
1978	Jacques Legendre	RPR
1978	Claude Pringalle	RPR
1981	Jean Le Garrec	PS
1981	Denise Cacheux	PS
1986	Proportional representation - no election by constituency	
1988	Georges Hage	PCF
1993	Georges Hage	PCF
1997	Georges Hage	PCF
2002	Georges Hage	PCF
2007	Jean-Jacques Candelier	PCF
2012	Jean-Jacques Candelier	PCF
2017	Alain Bruneel	PCF
2022	Matthieu Marchio	RN

== Election results ==
=== 2024 ===
Legislative Election 2024: Nord's 16th constituency
Party	Candidate	Votes	%	±%
RN	Matthieu Marchio	26,608	53.12	+17.26
MoDem (Ensemble)	François Cresta	8,135	16.24	−1.09
PCF (NFP)	Alain Bruneel	14,199	28.35	−5.24
LO	Éric Pecqueur	1,145	2.29	+0.62
Turnout		50,087	97.08	+54.80
Registered electors		84,041		
RN hold		Swing		

=== 2022 ===
Legislative Election 2022: Nord's 16th constituency
Party	Candidate	Votes	%	±%
RN	Matthieu Marchio	12,416	35.86	+6.77
PCF (NUPÉS)	Alain Bruneel	11,632	33.59	-5.33
MoDem (Ensemble)	Chantal Rybak	5,245	15.15	−5.09
LR (UDC)	Mady Dorchies	1,838	5.31	−2.52
REC	Tanneguy Adriencense	990	2.86	N/A
PRG	Delphine Zagacki	967	2.79	N/A
PA	Antoine Stathoulias	962	2.78	N/A
LO	Eric Pecqueur	577	1.67	N/A
Turnout		34,627	42.28	−2.02
2nd round result
RN	Matthieu Marchio	16,321	50.34	+6.20
PCF (NUPÉS)	Alain Bruneel	16,098	49.66	−6.20
Turnout		32,419	41.98	+1.85
RN gain from PCF				

=== 2017 ===
Candidate	Label	First round		Second round	
Candidate	Label	Votes	%	Votes	%
Hortense de Mereuil	FN	10,444	29.09	13,478	44.14
Alain Bruneel	PCF	7,343	20.45	17,057	55.86
Chantal Rybak	MoDem	7,266	20.24		
Frédéric Delannoy	PS	5,584	15.55		
Nacéra Soltani	LR	2,812	7.83		
Philippe Bernard	ECO	1,050	2.92		
Roger Marie	EXG	705	1.96		
Loïc Jaspart	ECO	386	1.08		
Émilie Fauvel	DIV	311	0.87		
Votes		35,901	100.00	30,535	100.00
Valid votes		35,901	97.61	30,535	91.64
Blank votes		621	1.69	2,001	6.01
Null votes		258	0.70	783	2.35
Turnout		36,780	44.30	33,319	40.13
Abstentions		46,242	55.70	49,704	59.87
Registered voters		83,022		83,023	
Source: Ministry of the Interior

=== 2012 ===
Legislative Election 2012: Nord's 16th constituency
Party	Candidate	Votes	%	±%
PCF (FG)	Jean-Jacques Candelier	15,736	35.09	+2.17
PS	Christian Entem*	11,580	25.82	+1.98
FN	Marie Bocquet	9,189	20.49	+14.03
UMP	Mireille Morelle	6,123	13.65	−10.19
Others	N/A	2,214		
Turnout		44,842	53.63	−4.01
2nd round result
PCF (FG)	Jean-Jacques Candelier	23,461	100.00	+33.81
Turnout		23,461	28.06	−29.48
PCF hold				

* Withdrew before the 2nd round

=== 2007 ===
Legislative Election 2007: Nord's 16th constituency
Party	Candidate	Votes	%	±%
PCF	Jean-Jacques Candelier	15,239	32.92	
UMP	Michelle Derain	11,038	23.84	
PS	Jeannine Marquaille	9,565	20.66	
FN	Monique Delevallet	2,993	6.46	
MoDem	Angelo Errera-Muller	2,067	4.46	
LV	Philippe Bernard	979	2.11	
Others	N/A	4,416		
Turnout		47,425	57.64	
2nd round result
PCF	Jean-Jacques Candelier	29,565	66.09	
UMP	Michelle Derain	15,169	33.91	
Turnout		46,741	57.52	
PCF hold				

=== 2002 ===
Legislative Election 2002: Nord's 16th constituency
Party	Candidate	Votes	%	±%
PCF	Georges Hage	14,186	30.01	
PS	Jeannine Marquaille*	9,585	20.28	
UMP	Patrick Vanandrewelt	9,301	19.68	
FN	Emile Messager	7,193	15.22	
UDF	Liliane Sniadach	1,669	3.53	
CPNT	Edouard de Notaris	1,203	2.55	
LO	Florence L'Hostis	974	2.06	
LCR	Eric Gola	973	2.06	
LV	Philippe Bernard	969	2.05	
Others	N/A	1,215		
Turnout		48,521	60.76	
2nd round result
PCF	Georges Hage	22,680	100.00	
Turnout		30,445	38.12	
PCF hold				

* Withdrew before the 2nd round

=== 1997 ===
Legislative Election 1997: Nord's 16th constituency
Party	Candidate	Votes	%	±%
PCF	Georges Hage	20,010	37.69	
PS	Jeannine Marquaille*	9,859	18.57	
FN	René Gambiez	7,021	13.23	
RPR	Serge Gaillot	6,917	13.03	
UDF	Patrick Vanandrewelt**	4,091	7.71	
LO	Laurence Viguie	1,772	3.34	
LV	Philippe Bernard	1,487	2.80	
DVE	Béatrice Pottier	1,070	2.02	
Others	N/A	857		
Turnout		55,681	72.59	
2nd round result
PCF	Georges Hage	33,103	100.00	
Turnout		45,270	59.02	
PCF hold				

* Withdrew before the 2nd round

** UDF dissident

== Sources ==
- Official results of French elections from 1998: "Résultats électoraux officiels en France" (in French).
