= Alain Bocquet =

French politician

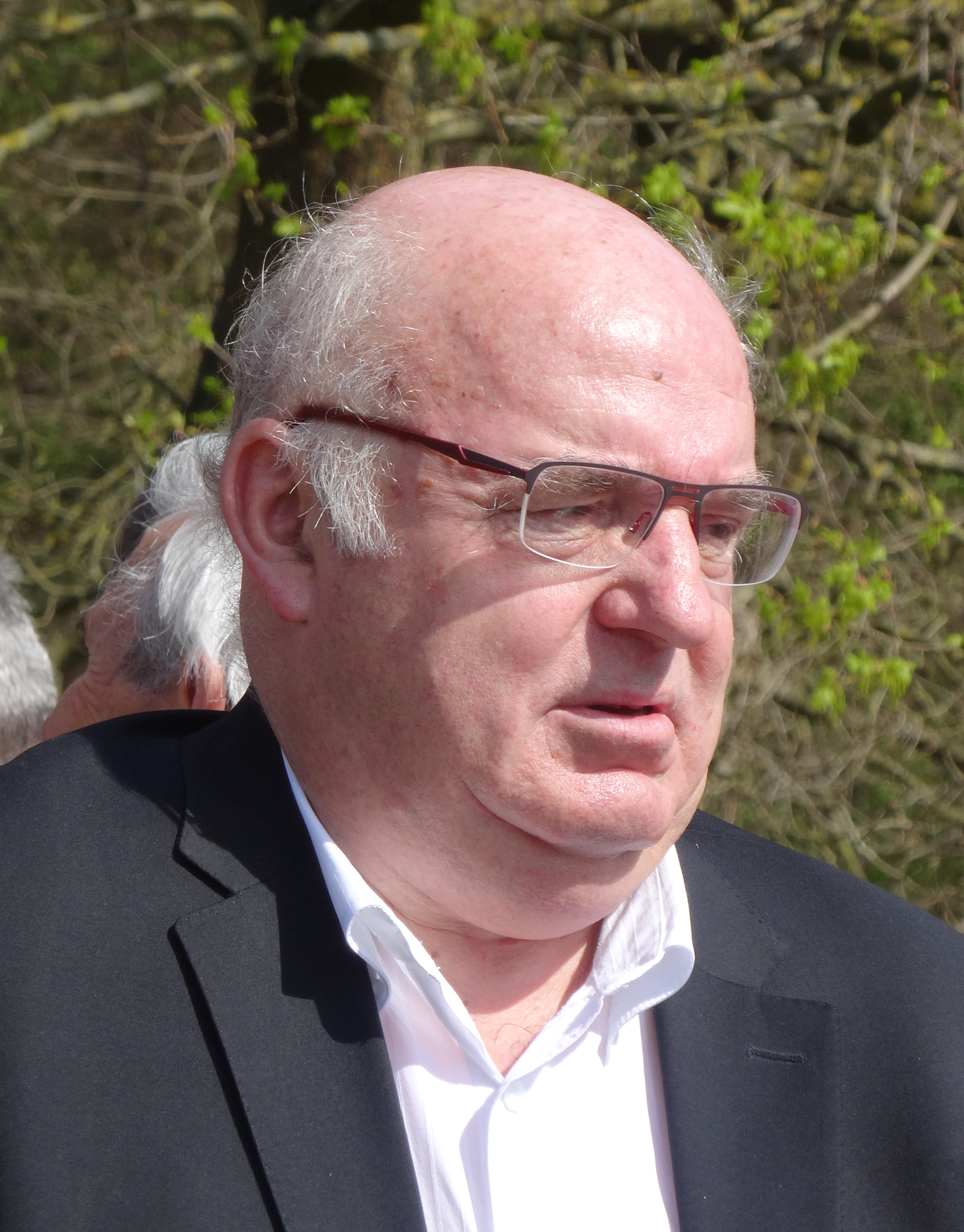

Mayor of Saint-Amand-les-Eaux
- In office 25 June 1995 – 30 January 2025
- Preceded by: Georges Donnez

President of the Communauté d'agglomération de la Porte du Hainaut
- In office 22 December 2000 – 11 July 2020
- Succeeded by: Aymeric Robin

French Deputy
- In office 3 April 1978 – 20 June 2017
- Preceded by: Georges Donnez (19th constituency); Gustave Ansart (20th constituency)
- Succeeded by: Gustave Ansart (19th constituency); Fabien Roussel (20th constituency)
- Parliamentary group: Communist (1978–2007); GDR(2007–2017)
- Constituency: Nord's 19th constituency (1978–1986); Nord (1986–1988); Nord's 20th constituency (1988–2017)

Personal details
- Born: 6 May 1946 (age 79) Marquillies, France
- Party: PCF
- Relatives: Éric Bocquet (brother)

Alain Bocquet (born 6 May 1946) is a French politician.

A member of the French Communist Party (PCF), he was a Deputy from the Nord department of France between 1978 and 2017 and president of the communist parliamentary group from 1993 to 2007. He served as part of the regional council of Nord-Pas-de-Calais from 1992 to 1998 and was mayor of Saint-Amand-les-Eaux from 1995 to 2025.

== Biography ==
Bocquet was born in Marquillies in 1946. Before going into politics, he was a social worker. His younger brother, Éric Bocquet, is also a politician, and in 2016 they published a book together about tax evasion and fraud, Sans domicile fisc.

== Summary of mandates ==
=== National mandates ===
- 3 April 1978 — 1 April 1986: Deputy of the Nord's 19th constituency.
- 2 April 1986 — 14 May 1988: Deputy from the Nord (proportional representation).
- 12 June 1988 — 20 June 2017: Deputy of the Nord's 20th constituency.

=== Local mandates ===
- 21 March 1977 — 13 March 1983: Deputy mayor of Lille.
- 14 March 983 — 12 March 1989: Municipal councillor of Valenciennes.
- 23 March 1992 — 15 March 1998: Regional councillor of Nord-Pas-de-Calais.
- 25 June 1995 — 30 January 2025: Mayor of Saint-Amand-les-Eaux.
- 22 December 2000 — 11 July 2020: President of the communauté d'agglomération de la Porte du Hainaut.
