= Nord's 9th constituency =

Constituency of the National Assembly of France

9th constituency of the Nord
- inline Constituency of the National Assembly of France

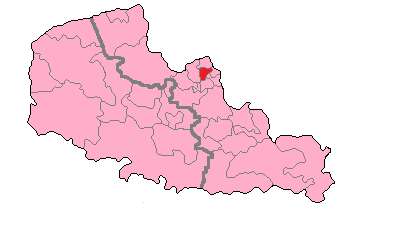
- Nord's 9th Constituency shown within Nord-Pas-de-Calais
- Deputy: Violette Spillebout; RE
- Department: Nord
- Cantons: Lille-Nord-Est (part), Marcq-en-Barœul, Tourcoing-Sud.
- Registered voters: 89,257

The 9th constituency of the Nord is a French legislative constituency in the Nord département.

== Description ==
Nord's 9th constituency includes the north east of Lille and the south of Tourcoing as well as the suburb of Marcq-en-Barœul, which lies between the two. The canton of Lille Nord-Est was only added in the 2010 redistricting of French legislative constituencies.

Politically the seat was entirely consistent in its support until 2017 of the Gaullist right since the inception of the 5th Republic.

== Historic Representation ==
| Election | Member | Party |
|---|---|---|
| 1958 | René Lecocq | UNR |
| 1962 | René Lecocq | UNR |
| 1967 | Henri Blary | UDR |
| 1968 | Henri Blary | UDR |
| 1973 | Henri Blary | UDR |
| 1978 | Serge Charles | RPR |
| 1981 | Serge Charles | RPR |
| 1986 | Proportional representation - no election by constituency | |
| 1988 | Serge Charles | RPR |
| 1993 | Serge Charles | RPR |
| 1997 | Patrick Delnatte | RPR |
| 2002 | Patrick Delnatte | UMP |
| 2007 | Bernard Gérard | UMP |
| 2012 | Bernard Gérard | UMP |
| 2017 | Valérie Petit | LREM |
| 2022 | Violette Spillebout | RE |

== Election results ==
=== 2024 ===
Legislative Election 2024: Nord's 9th constituency
| Party | Candidate | Votes | % | ±% |
|---|---|---|---|---|
| EXG | Mathias Dhelin | 4 | 0.01 | N/A |
| RN | Christine Landru | 12,533 | 20.67 | +11.04 |
| RE (Ensemble) | Violette Spillebout | 20,620 | 34.01 | +2.09 |
| REC | Valérie Talpaert | 561 | 0.93 | −3.45 |
| Volt | Frédéric Gruzon | 161 | 0.27 | N/A |
| LR | Alice Pogam | 5,572 | 9.19 | −11.26 |
| LÉ–EELV (NFP) | Odile Vidal-Sagnier | 18,869 | 31.12 | +3.90 |
| LO | Chantal Sarazin | 477 | 0.79 | N/A |
| DVD | Charles Delavenne | 1,832 | 3.02 | N/A |
| Turnout | | 60,629 | 98.45 | +51.30 |
| Registered electors | | 92,045 | | |
2nd round result
| RE | Violette Spillebout | 27,081 | 45.10 | +11.09 |
| LÉ–EELV | Odile Vidal-Sagnier | 19,351 | 32.23 | +1.11 |
| RN | Christine Landru | 13,616 | 22.68 | +2.01 |
| Turnout | | 60,048 | 98.10 | −0.35 |
| Registered electors | | 92,071 | | |
| RE hold | | Swing | | |

=== 2022 ===
Legislative Election 2022: Nord's 9th constituency
| Party | Candidate | Votes | % | ±% |
|---|---|---|---|---|
| LREM (Ensemble) | Violette Spillebout | 13,889 | 31.92 | -7.26 |
| EELV (NUPÉS) | Odile Vidal-Sagnier | 11,841 | 27.22 | +9.55 |
| LR (UDC) | Nicolas Papiachvili | 8,897 | 20.45 | −5.01 |
| RN | Christine Landru | 4,190 | 9.63 | +1.93 |
| REC | Sylvie Goddyn | 1,904 | 4.38 | N/A |
| Volt | Eric Galera | 934 | 2.15 | N/A |
| PA | Laurent Peturque | 933 | 2.14 | N/A |
| Others | N/A | 920 | 2.11 | |
| Turnout | | 43,508 | 47.75 | −0.18 |
2nd round result
| LREM (Ensemble) | Violette Spillebout | 23,990 | 59.10 | +7.04 |
| EELV (NUPÉS) | Odile Vidal-Sagnier | 16,602 | 40.90 | N/A |
| Turnout | | 40,592 | 46.58 | +5.04 |
| LREM hold | | | | |

=== 2017 ===
| Candidate | Label | First round | | Second round | |
| Candidate | Label | Votes | % | Votes | % |
|---|---|---|---|---|---|
| Valérie Petit | REM | 16,999 | 39.18 | 18,281 | 52.06 |
| Bernard Gérard | LR | 11,047 | 25.46 | 16,837 | 47.94 |
| Céleste Van Isterdael | FI | 4,963 | 11.44 | | |
| Valérie Talpaert | FN | 3,340 | 7.70 | | |
| Sandrine Rousseau | ECO | 2,058 | 4.74 | | |
| Denis Tonnel | DVD | 1,322 | 3.05 | | |
| Isabelle Jouny | PRG | 1,279 | 2.95 | | |
| Martine Roussel-Vanhée | PCF | 646 | 1.49 | | |
| Jérôme Garcia | DVD | 474 | 1.09 | | |
| Jean-Luc Landru | DLF | 427 | 0.98 | | |
| Réjane Doré | EXD | 233 | 0.54 | | |
| Catherine Hermary | DIV | 221 | 0.51 | | |
| Maryline Mouchoux | EXG | 209 | 0.48 | | |
| Sofia Djeddi | DVG | 140 | 0.32 | | |
| Bastien Denoyelle | DIV | 33 | 0.08 | | |
| Votes | | 43,391 | 100.00 | 35,118 | 100.00 |
| Valid votes | | 43,391 | 98.81 | 35,118 | 92.28 |
| Blank votes | | 366 | 0.83 | 2,110 | 5.54 |
| Null votes | | 158 | 0.36 | 829 | 2.18 |
| Turnout | | 43,915 | 47.93 | 38,057 | 41.54 |
| Abstentions | | 47,700 | 52.07 | 53,561 | 58.46 |
| Registered voters | | 91,615 | | 91,618 | |
Source: Ministry of the Interior

=== 2012 ===
Legislative Election 2012: Nord's 9th constituency
| Party | Candidate | Votes | % | ±% |
|---|---|---|---|---|
| UMP | Bernard Gérard | 22,282 | 47.71 | |
| PRG | Jacques Mutez | 11,848 | 25.37 | |
| FN | Jean-François Bloc | 4,776 | 10.23 | |
| FG | Martine Roussel-Vanhee | 2,412 | 5.16 | |
| MoDem | Mariette Bontinck | 1,279 | 2.74 | |
| Others | N/A | 2,058 | | |
| Turnout | | 46,702 | 52.32 | |
2nd round result
| UMP | Bernard Gérard | 26,377 | 61.21 | |
| PRG | Jacques Mutez | 16,718 | 38.79 | |
| Turnout | | 43,095 | 48.28 | |
| UMP hold | | | | |

=== 2007 ===
Legislative Election 2007: Nord's 9th constituency
| Party | Candidate | Votes | % | ±% |
|---|---|---|---|---|
| UMP | Bernard Gérard | 23,643 | 60.20 | |
| PS | Maryse Brimont | 6,144 | 15.65 | |
| MoDem | Anne Collot | 3,728 | 9.49 | |
| FN | Frédéric Butez | 1,612 | 4.10 | |
| LV | Daniel Compere | 1,105 | 2.81 | |
| PCF | Martine Roussel | 810 | 2.06 | |
| Others | N/A | 2,229 | | |
| Turnout | | 39,754 | 56.90 | |
| UMP hold | | | | |

=== 2002 ===
Legislative Election 2002: Nord's 9th constituency
| Party | Candidate | Votes | % | ±% |
|---|---|---|---|---|
| UMP | Patrick Delnatte | 22,061 | 56.41 | |
| PS | Sylvie Boudry | 7,169 | 18.33 | |
| FN | Simone Bonnave | 5,109 | 13.06 | |
| LV | Olivier Descamps | 908 | 2.32 | |
| Others | N/A | 3,859 | | |
| Turnout | | 39,702 | 60.63 | |
| UMP hold | | | | |

=== 1997 ===
Legislative Election 1997: Nord's 9th constituency
| Party | Candidate | Votes | % | ±% |
|---|---|---|---|---|
| RPR | Patrick Delnatte | 17,099 | 42.66 | |
| PRG | Colette Huvenne | 9,428 | 23.52 | |
| FN | Michel Ximenes | 7,598 | 18.96 | |
| DVD | Elisabeth Bourgois | 1,982 | 4.94 | |
| GE | Etienne Forest | 1,479 | 3.69 | |
| UDF | Jean-Pierre Lemai* | 959 | 2.39 | |
| DVE | Gérard Wozniak | 915 | 2.28 | |
| Others | N/A | 622 | | |
| Turnout | | 41,746 | 64.89 | |
2nd round result
| RPR | Patrick Delnatte | 25,814 | 63.83 | |
| PRG | Colette Huvenne | 14,630 | 36.17 | |
| Turnout | | 42,540 | 66.13 | |
| RPR hold | | | | |

* UDF dissident

== Sources ==
- Official results of French elections from 1998: "Résultats électoraux officiels en France" (in French).
