= Guillaume Florquin =

French politician (born 1993)

Member of the National Assembly for Nord's 20th constituency
- Incumbent
- Assumed office 18 July 2024
- Preceded by: Fabien Roussel

Personal details
- Born: 4 May 1993 (age 32)
- Political party: National Rally

Guillaume Florquin (born 4 May 1993) is a French politician.

A member of the National Rally (RN), he was elected to represent the 20th constituency of the Nord department as a deputy in the 2024 French legislative election. He defeated incumbent deputy and national-secretary of the French Communist Party Fabien Roussel.

== Biography ==
Guillaume Florquin was born on May 4, 1993, in Roncq. He attended high school at the private Lycée Notre-Dame des Anges in Saint-Amand-les-Eaux. He is the nephew of Marcel Aubursin, first deputy to the former UDF mayor of the town, Georges Donnez.

In 2016, he met Marine Le Pen and joined the National Front. The following year, he ran for legislative elections as the deputy for Ludovic de Danne, Marine Le Pen's diplomatic advisor, who was parachuted into the Nord's 20th constituency.

In December 2019, he announced his candidacy for the 2020 municipal elections in Saint-Amand-les-Eaux and presented his list on February 23, 2020. On March 15, his list came in third with 11.71% of the vote, far behind that of the outgoing communist mayor, Alain Bocquet, who was re-elected in the first round with 50.96% of the vote. His list's score was enough to allow the National Rally (formerly the National Front) to return to the city council.

In 2022, he ran for 2024 French legislative election in the 20th district of the North, but this time as an incumbent candidate. With 32.64% of the votes cast, he was elected in the first round but was defeated in the second round by the outgoing deputy Fabien Roussel, national secretary of the French Communist Party. Two years later, Emmanuel Macron's decision to dissolve the National Assembly allowed him to run again. With 50.30% of the votes cast, he was elected in the first round, eliminating Fabien Roussel and swinging this district, which had been represented by the PCF since 1962.
