= Denise Cacheux =

French politician

Member of the National Assembly for Nord's 5th constituency
- In office 13 June 1988 – 1 April 1993
- Preceded by: Proportional by department
- Succeeded by: Bernard Davoine

Member of the National Assembly for Nord's 16th constituency
- In office 25 July 1981 – 1 April 1986
- Preceded by: Jean Le Garrec
- Succeeded by: Proportional by department

Personal details
- Born: Denise Jeanne Henriette Habigand; 18 March 1932 Nancy, Meurthe-et-Moselle, France
- Died: 12 December 2023 (aged 91) Lille, Hauts-de-France, France
- Party: Socialist Party
- Awards: Officer of the Legion of Honour

Denise Jeanne Henriette Cacheux (née Habigand; 18 March 1932 – 12 December 2023) was a French politician of the Socialist Party. Trained as a social worker, she was an elected municipal councillor of Lille City Council from 1971 to 1983 and to the Urban Community of Lille. Cacheux was deputy mayor of Lille between 1977 and 1983. In 1981, Cacheux was elected to the Regional Council of Nord-Pas-de-Calais as a regional councillor from 1979 to 1992. She represented Nord's 16th constituency in the National Assembly from 1981 to 1986 and again from 1987 to 1993, this time for Nord's 5th constituency. Cacheux was appointed Knight of the Legion of Honour in 1997, promoted to officer in 2011.

== Early life ==
Cacheux was born in Nancy, Meurthe-et-Moselle on 18 March 1932, and was the oldest of six children of a Catholic family. She was the daughter of Georges Habigand, a draftsman for the SNCF, and Marie-Therese Habigand (née Aubry), her mother who was a devout Catholic. Cacheux grew up in Rouen. She was educated at Lycée Jeanne-d'Arc in Nancy, then at the Lycée Jeanne-d'Arc in Rouen and finally at the Rouen Departmental School for Nursing and Social Work. Cacheux obtained a diploma in nursing and another in social worker, and was an activist for the Teams of Our Lady organisation, a Catholic youth movement.

== Career ==
From 1954 to 1961, Cacheux was a social worker and was then a professor of social studies between 1961 and 1977. She was a founder member of the Citizen 60 club in Normandy, joined the La Vie Nouvelle association and the Convention of Republican Institutions in 1965, the latter she joined following a symposium in Grenoble and later became a departmental head. Cacheux was also part of the French Movement for Family Planning. After the Epinay Congress, she joined the Socialist Party in June 1971. That same year, Cacheux was elected to Lille City Council as a municipal councillor on the list of Augustin Laurent, the deputy mayor in charge of animation. She was also a councillor of the Urban Community of Lille from 1971 to 1977. Cacheux was a member of the Socialist Party's Control Commission from June 1973, a national delegate for Women's Action between 1975 and 1977, the PS steering committee in February 1975, getting re-elected on 19 June 1977, and was vice-president and member of the presidium of the steering committee from 1979 to 1981.

She was elected deputy mayor of Lille in 1977 and as a regional councillor for the Regional Council of Nord-Pas-de-Calais in 1979. For the 1979 European Parliament election in France, Cacheux was 48th in line in the Radical Party of the Left-Socialist Party's list but failed to be elected; she had earlier failed to be elected to the National Assembly in the 1978 French legislative election. In the 1981 French legislative election, Cacheux was sent by Pierre Mauroy as the first substitute to Jean Le Garrec for Nord's 16th constituency in the Cambrai region. She became a deputy of Nord's 16th constituency when Le Garrec was appointed to serve in the Mauroy government. Cacheux took up her seat on 25 July 1981. She was vice-president of the Socialist parliamentary group from 1982 to 1986, and was a municipal councillor in Cambrai between 1983 and 1988. In 1986, Cacheux was appointed quaestor of the National Assembly, the first woman to hold the position. She held the role until that March.

Cacheux did not get re-elected to the National Assembly in the 1986 French legislative election held that March because she was 10th on the Socialist Party list for the Nord department. On 15 May 1987, she regained her seat in the assembly following the resignation of Arthur Notebart but serving as deputy for Nord. In 1988, Cacheux was sent to contest the Nord's 5th constituency (Haubourdin and Seclin) as an incumbent candidate and was elected to the seat in that year's French legislative election on 12 June. She took up her seat the following day. Cacheux was on Committee on Constitutional Laws, Legislation, and General Administration of the Republic; chaired the parliamentary delegation for demographic issues and participated in the parliamentary inquiry committees on the Mafia and AIDS. She was also the FNESER's national delegate for family and childhood issues. Cacheux was president of the France-Namibian friendship group, and was secretary of the socialist federation of the North between 1992 and 1993.

She lost her seat on the Nord-Pas-de-Calais regional council in March 1992 because she was 29th on the Socialist Party's list, and then her seat in the National Assembly the following year when she lost in the nomination process. After 1993, she focused on children's rights and gender equality and in the non-profit sector.

== Personal life ==
Cacheux was married to Pierre Cacheux on 8 October 1955. There were three children of the marriage. Cacheux died in Lille on 12 December 2023. Her funeral was held at Église du Sacré-Cœur de Lille on the morning of 16 December.

== Recognition ==
In July 1997, Cacheux was appointed Knight of the Legion of Honour. She was promoted to Officer of the Legion of Honour in April 2011. The Lazare-Garreau Community Centre was renamed after her on 26 June 2023.
