= Fabien Roussel =

French politician (born 1969)

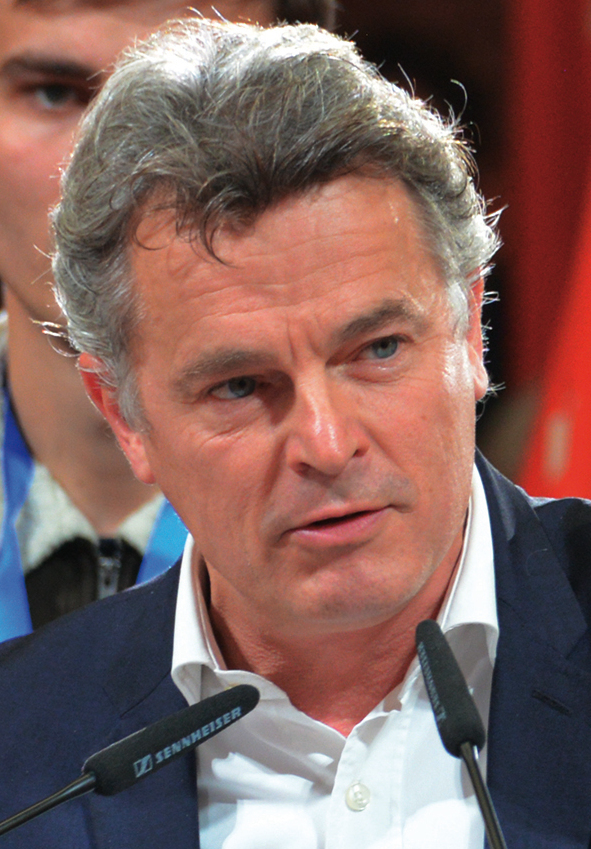
- Roussel in 2018

Mayor of Saint-Amand-les-Eaux
- Incumbent
- Assumed office 30 January 2025
- Preceded by: Alain Bocquet

Member of the National Assembly for Nord's 20th constituency
- In office 21 June 2017 – 9 June 2024
- Preceded by: Alain Bocquet
- Succeeded by: Guillaume Florquin

National Secretary of the French Communist Party
- Incumbent
- Assumed office 25 November 2018
- Preceded by: Pierre Laurent

Personal details
- Born: 16 April 1969 (age 57) Béthune, France
- Party: French Communist Party
- Profession: Journalist; politician
- Website: Website

Fabien Roussel (French pronunciation: [fabjɛ̃ ʁusɛl]; born 16 April 1969) is a French politician who has served as national secretary of the French Communist Party (PCF) since 2018. He was the party's candidate in the 2022 French presidential election where he placed eighth in the first round. Roussel represented the Nord's 20th constituency in the National Assembly from 2017 to 2024.

== Early life ==
From a family of activists, Fabien Roussel is the son of Daniel Roussel, former journalist at L'Humanité. After he finished high school in Champigny-sur-Marne, in the Paris region, he graduated from the Journalists Development Centre (CPJ). He began his career as an image reporter at the Ardennes regional branch of television channel France 3. One of his paternal great-grandfathers was a Spanish refugee who died after being interned in the Vernet camp.

== Early political career ==
During his high school years, Fabien Roussel engaged in the Mouvement Jeunes Communistes de France (MJCF) to denounce the apartheid in South Africa and demanded the release of Nelson Mandela. He also participated in major demonstrations against the Monory law and Devaquet bill, related respectively to employee shareholding and university organisation.

From 1997, he was advisor in charge of communication for communist Michelle Demessine, then Secretary of State for Tourism under Prime Minister Lionel Jospin. He then worked for Jean-Jacques Candelier and Alain Bocquet.

== Political career ==
In 2017, Roussel was elected to succeed Bocquet as the Member of Parliament for the 20th constituency of Nord as a member of the French Communist Party. He became party leader in 2018.

On 9 May 2021, Roussel won the Communist nomination for the 2022 presidential election. He was defeated in the first round of voting, placing eighth and garnering just 2.28% of the vote, the second-lowest vote share the party has ever managed in a presidential election.

He was re-elected in the 2022 legislative elections as a deputy for the 20th constituency of Nord.

In September 2023, Fabien Roussel had launched a call "to invade gas stations and supermarkets", considering that it was "self-defense" in the face of rising prices. In response to rising costs of gasoline and food, Roussel stated: "We are being fleeced, attacked, racketeered, and we should say nothing? There are concrete measures to implement to lower prices, block them at the bottom... We are calling for mobilization, to invade gas stations, supermarkets, prefectures, because the State is responsible. It is a question of self-defense." These statements earned him denunciation from Jean-Luc Mélenchon.

In 2023, La France Insoumise deputy Sophia Chikirou compared Roussel to Jacques Doriot, a French communist who was later expelled from the Communist party and became a fascist collaborator with Nazi Germany. Jean-Luc Mélenchon reposted this comparison on Facebook.

In November 2023, he announced that "The PCF has definitively broken with La France Insoumise" and ended participation of the PCF in the NUPES alliance.

In 2024, Roussel was defeated by the National Rally candidate Guillaume Florquin in the first round of that year's snap elections, his seat had been held by PCF since 1962. Roussel blamed his participation in New Popular Front alliance together with La France Insoumise for his loss. He claimed: "The alliance, as it was built, does not allow us to win. It allows for big scores in the big cities, but small ones in rural areas and in the sub-prefectures. It even made people vote for RN!". He confirmed, that if he had to run again, it wouldn't be in an alliance with La France Insoumise.

== Political positions ==
Roussel takes progressive positions on socioeconomic issues and favours raising the minimum wage to €1,500 a month post-tax, as well as reducing the workweek to 32 hours and lowering the retirement age to 60. Unlike many French leftists, he is strongly supportive of nuclear power and has expressed a positive view of hunting. He has expressed support for the 2023 pension reform strikes. He is against entry of Ukraine into NATO and the EU, and also voted against security agreement with Ukraine.

Roussel has been described as left-conservative for his connection with sovereignty and nationalism.

After The Ecologists deputy Sandrine Rousseau criticised meat consumption as contributor to climate change, Roussel strongly defended meat consumption as part of French gastronomy.

Roussel supported resolution criticising Israel as apartheid and urging the French government to "recognize the State of Palestine" but also to call at the UN for an embargo on arms supplies to Israel and to impose "targeted sanctions" against Israeli officials "most involved in the crime of apartheid". After the October 7 attacks, Roussel, Socialist Party and The Ecologists criticised La France Insoumise for refusing to call Hamas a terrorist organisation. A year later LFI called Hamas terrorists.

== Personal life ==
Roussel lives with his partner Dorothée, a civil servant of category C.

== See also ==
- General Secretary of the Communist Party
