= Sébastien Huyghe =

French politician (born 1969)

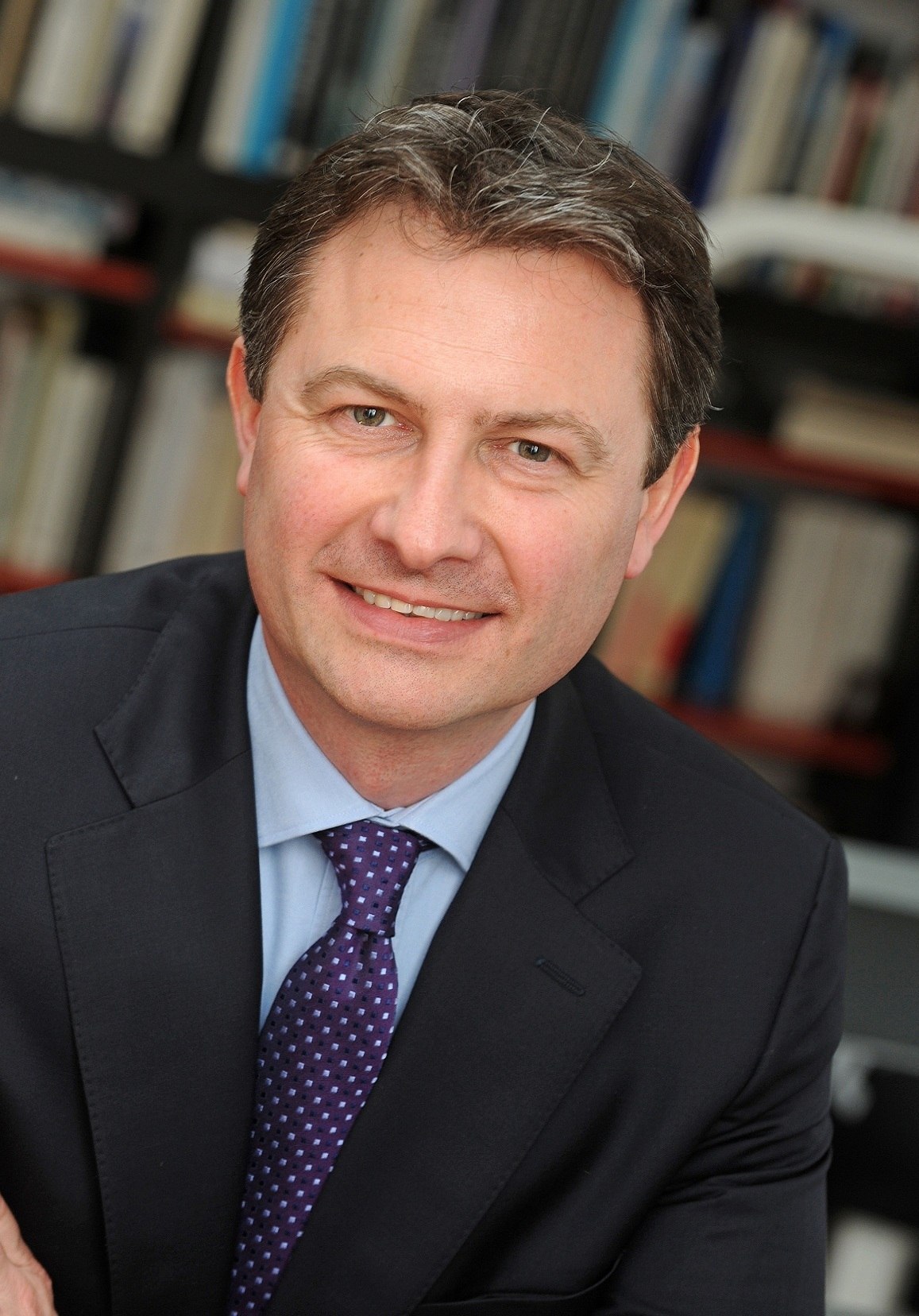

Member of the National Assembly for Nord's 5th constituency
- In office 21 June 2002 – June 2022
- Preceded by: Martine Aubry
- Succeeded by: Victor Catteau

Personal details
- Born: 25 October 1969 (age 56) Béthune, France
- Party: The Republicans
- Spouse: Valérie Debord (m. 2018)
- Education: University of Lille

Sébastien Huyghe (born 25 October 1969) is a French politician and member of the Republicans who served as a member of the National Assembly of France from 2002 to 2022, representing the Nord department.

== Political career ==
Huyghe joined the Union for a Popular Movement (UMP) in 2002, which later changed its name in The Republicans.

From 2014 until 2016, Huyghe served as party spokesperson under the leadership of its chairman Nicolas Sarkozy, alongside Isabelle Le Callennec (2014-2015) and Lydia Guirous (2015-2016). In the Republicans’ 2016 presidential primaries, he endorsed Sarkozy as the party's candidate for the office of President of France.

In the Republicans’ 2017 leadership election, Huyghe endorsed Laurent Wauquiez.

In parliament, Huyghe serves on the Committee on Legal Affairs. In addition to his committee assignments, he is part of the French-Argentinian Parliamentary Friendship Group.

He lost his seat in the first round of the 2022 French legislative election.
