= Paul Christophe =

French politician (born 1971)

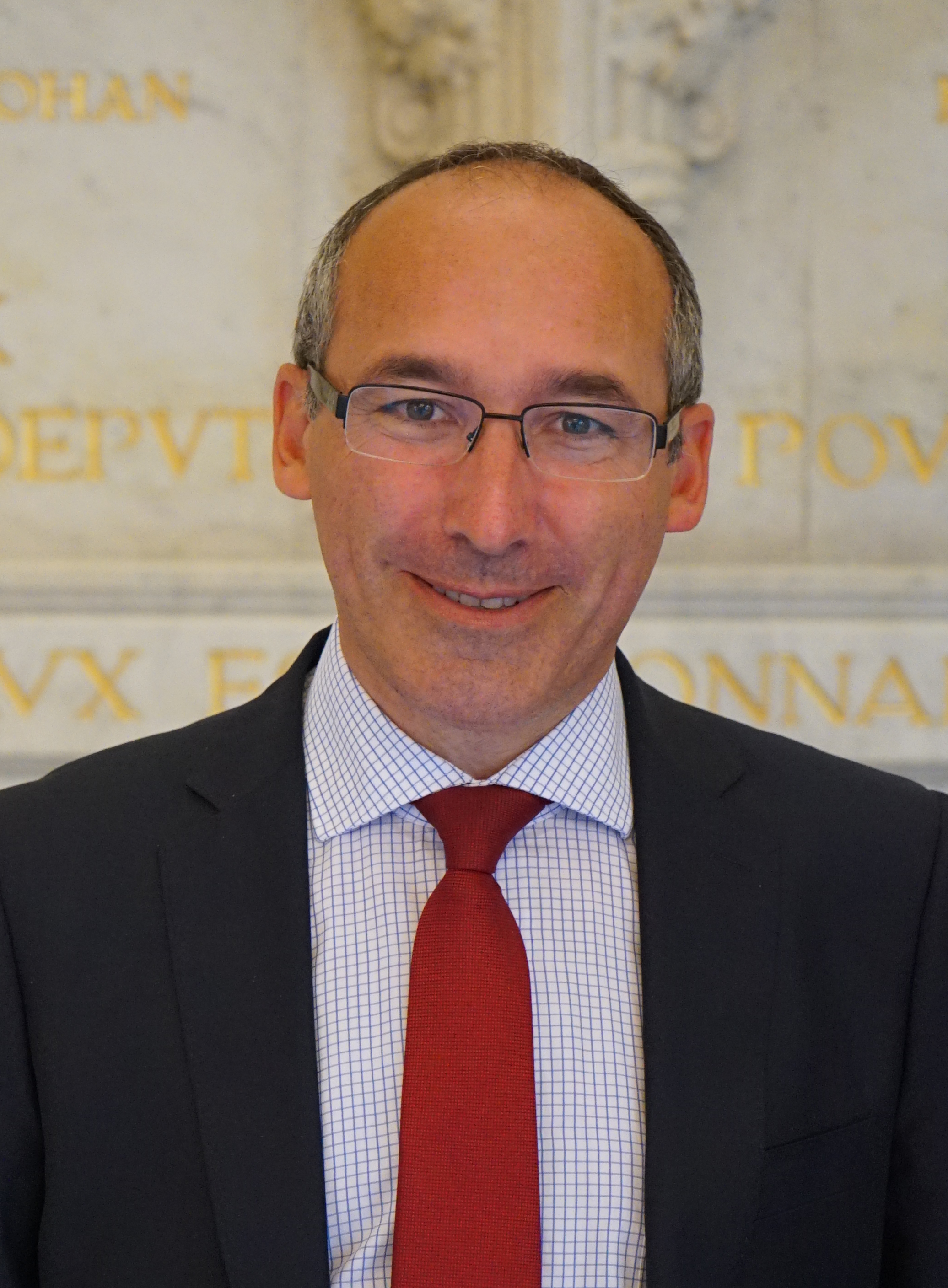
- Christophe in 2017

Minister of Solidarity, Autonomy and Equality between Women and Men
- Incumbent
- Assumed office 21 September 2024
- Prime Minister: Michel Barnier
- Preceded by: Catherine Vautrin (Solidarity); Fadila Khattabi (Autonomy); Aurore Bergé (Equality between Women and Men)

Member of the National Assembly for Nord's 14th constituency
- Incumbent
- Assumed office 21 June 2017
- Preceded by: Jean-Pierre Decool

Personal details
- Born: 10 February 1971 (age 55) Les Sables-d'Olonne, Vendée, France
- Party: Horizons (2021–)
- Other political affiliations: Republican (until 2017); Agir (2017–2021)

Paul Christophe (born 10 February 1971) is a French politician who has represented Nord's 14th constituency in the National Assembly since 2017. From September to December 2024, he briefly served as Minister of Solidarity, Autonomy, and Gender Equality in the government of Prime Minister Michel Barnier.

== Early life ==
Christophe was born in Les Sables-d'Olonne in the department of Vendée.

== Career ==
In 2015, Christophe was appointed to the local information commission of the Gravelines Nuclear Power Station.

Christophe was elected in the 2017 French parliamentary election as a Republican in Nord's 14th constituency. In parliament, he has since been serving on the Committee on Social Affairs.

In November 2017, Christophe joined the new Agir party.
