= Nord's 5th constituency =

Constituency of the National Assembly of France

5th constituency of the Nord
- inline Constituency of the National Assembly of France

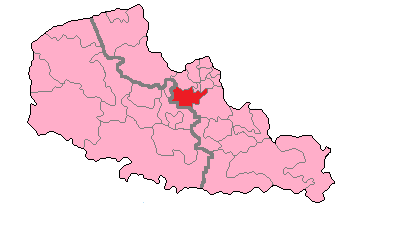
- Nord's 5th Constituency shown within Nord-Pas-de-Calais
- Deputy: Sébastien Huyghe; REN
- Department: Nord
- Cantons: La Bassée, Haubourdin (part), Seclin-Nord, Seclin-Sud
- Registered voters: 96,486

The 5th constituency of the Nord is a French legislative constituency in the Nord département.

== Description ==
Nord's 5th constituency lies in the centre of the department to the south of Lille. The main town is Seclin which is still part of the Métropole Européenne de Lille but this left leaning town is outweighed by the more conservative surrounding areas.

Despite 40 years of uninterrupted Socialist Party control between 1962 and 2002, the seat turned right in the 21st century, and was held by the conservative UMP or Republicans between 2002 and 2022, before being won by the far-right RN.

== Historic representation ==
Election	Member	Party
1958	Georges Brice	UNR
1962	Arthur Notebart	PS
1967	Arthur Notebart	PS
1968	Arthur Notebart	PS
1973	Arthur Notebart	PS
1978	Arthur Notebart	PS
1981	Arthur Notebart	PS
1986	Proportional representation – no election by constituency	
1988	Denise Cacheux	PS
1993	Bernard Davoine	PS
1997	Martine Aubry	PS
1997	Bernard Davoine	PS
2002	Sébastien Huyghe	UMP
2007	Sébastien Huyghe	UMP
2012	Sébastien Huyghe	UMP
2017	Sébastien Huyghe	LR
2022	Victor Catteau	RN
2024	Sébastien Huyghe	REN

== Election results ==
=== 2024 ===
Legislative Election 2024: Nord's 5th constituency
Party	Candidate	Votes	%	±%
NPA	Chloé Olivereau	24	0.04	N/A
LO	Raymond Covain	858	1.25	N/A
RN	Victor Catteau	27,411	40.08	+15.11
LFI (NFP)	Ophélie Delneste	16,591	24.26	−0.72
RE (Ensemble)	Sébastien Huyghe	23,510	34.37	+9.81
Turnout		68,394	97.25	+46.11
Registered electors		102,283		
2nd round result
RE	Sébastien Huyghe	37,411	56.65	+22.28
RN	Victor Catteau	28,626	43.35	+3.27
Turnout		66,037	95.64	−1.61
Registered electors		102,381		
RE gain from RN				

=== 2022 ===
Legislative Election 2022: Nord's 5th constituency
Party	Candidate	Votes	%	±%
LFI (NUPÉS)	Ophélie Delneste	12,213	24.98	+1.65
RN	Victor Catteau	12,211	24.97	+6.48
LREM (Ensemble)	Frédéric Cauderlier	12,012	24.56	−5.40
LR (UDC)	Sébastien Huyghe	8,562	17.51	−6.12
PA	Manon Stoffel	1,498	3.06	N/A
REC	Hugues Sion	1,196	2.45	N/A
Others	N/A	1,208	2.47	
Turnout		48,900	49.15	−1.67
2nd round result
RN	Victor Catteau	20,658	51.14	N/A
LFI (NUPÉS)	Ophélie Delneste	19,736	48.86	N/A
Turnout		40,394	47.26	+4.01
RN gain from LR				

=== 2017 ===
Candidate	Label	First round		Second round	
Candidate	Label	Votes	%	Votes	%
Guillaume Dekoninck	REM	14,906	29.96	17,053	44.48
Sébastien Huyghe	LR	11,757	23.63	21,284	55.52
Victor Catteau	FN	9,199	18.49		
Lucile Caplier	FI	6,507	13.08		
Aude Leduc	PS	2,151	4.32		
Françoise Dumez	PCF	1,530	3.07		
Yannick Brohard	ECO	1,421	2.86		
Guillaume Levecq	DLF	786	1.58		
Xavier Lapierre	EXG	425	0.85		
Francine Herbaut-Dauptain	ECO	411	0.83		
Florence Masselot	ECO	354	0.71		
Philippe Dambry	DIV	209	0.42		
Pierre Lehembre	DIV	100	0.20		
Béatrice Cuvelier	DVD	4	0.01		
Votes		49,760	100.00	38,337	100.00
Valid votes		49,760	98.05	38,337	88.76
Blank votes		752	1.48	3,511	8.13
Null votes		240	0.47	1,346	3.12
Turnout		50,752	50.82	43,194	43.25
Abstentions		49,119	49.18	56,682	56.75
Registered voters		99,871		99,876	
Source: Ministry of the Interior

=== 2012 ===
Legislative Election 2012: Nord's 5th constituency
Party	Candidate	Votes	%	±%
UMP	Sébastien Huyghe	19,885	35.66	−5.34
PS	Alain Cacheux	18,354	32.92	+6.96
FN	Serge Cattelin	8,851	15.87	+10.46
FG	Bernard Debreu	5,486	9.84	+1.67
Others	N/A	3,179		
Turnout		55,755	57.78	−1.77
2nd round result
UMP	Sébastien Huyghe	27,131	51.43	+0.70
PS	Alain Cacheux	25,626	48.57	−0.70
Turnout		52,757	54.68	−3.83
UMP hold				

=== 2007 ===
Legislative Election 2007: Nord's 5th constituency
Party	Candidate	Votes	%	±%
UMP	Sébastien Huyghe	21,161	41.00	+20.19
PS	Brigitte Parat	13,398	25.96	−5.13
MoDem	Dany Wattebled	4,785	9.27	N/A
PCF	Bernard Debreu	4,215	8.17	+1.85
FN	Thérèse Lesaffre	2,792	5.41	−7.13
LV	Pascale Leroy	1,401	2.71	−0.21
Far left	Mathilde Horn	1,153	2.23	N/A
Others	N/A	2,701		
Turnout		52,519	59.55	−2.92
2nd round result
UMP	Sébastien Huyghe	25,387	50.73	−0.36
PS	Brigitte Parat	24,657	49.27	+0.36
Turnout		52,474	58.51	−2.07
UMP hold				

=== 2002 ===
Legislative Election 2002: Nord's 5th constituency
Party	Candidate	Votes	%	±%
PS	Martine Aubry	15,822	31.09	−3.60
UMP	Sébastien Huyghe	10,591	20.81	−1.78
DVD	Dany Wattebled	7,185	14.12	N/A
FN	Viviane Ghyselinck	6,385	12.54	−5.50
PCF	Bernard Debreu	3,215	6.32	−6.29
MNR	Jacques Bourrez	1,847	3.63	N/A
LV	Sylvie Sergent	1,487	2.92	+0.54
LO	Xavier Lapierre	1,030	2.02	−1.25
Others	N/A	3,337		
Turnout		52,217	62.47	−8.62
2nd round result
UMP	Sébastien Huyghe	24,493	51.09	+11.90
PS	Martine Aubry	23,449	48.91	−11.90
Turnout		50,641	60.58	−11.32
UMP gain from PS				

=== 1997 ===
Legislative Election 1997: Nord's 5th constituency
Party	Candidate	Votes	%	±%
PS	Martine Aubry	18,751	34.69	
RPR	Jacques Donnay	12,208	22.59	
FN	Jacques Bourrez	9,751	18.04	
PCF	Jean-Claude Willem	6,816	12.61	
LO	Régis Debliqui	1,769	3.27	
LV	Arnold Gil	1,286	2.38	
Others	N/A	3,470		
Turnout		56,698	71.09	
2nd round result
PS	Martine Aubry	32,475	60.81	
RPR	Jacques Donnay	20,932	39.19	
Turnout		57,343	71.90	
PS hold				

== Sources ==
- Official results of French elections from 1998: "Résultats électoraux officiels en France" (in French).
