= Jean-Pierre Decool =

French politician

Jean-Pierre Decool (born 19 October 1952 in Bourbourg, Nord) is a member of the National Assembly of France. He represents the Nord department, and is a member of the Union for a Popular Movement.

In 2012, Decool said that the French army must breed more carrier pigeons, claiming that the Chinese army had decided to ramp up its own carrier pigeon training efforts. Decool said that carrier pigeons could play a key role in a crisis in which other communications systems started breaking down. His statements were widely reported in the media.
