= Jean-Jacques Candelier =

French politician

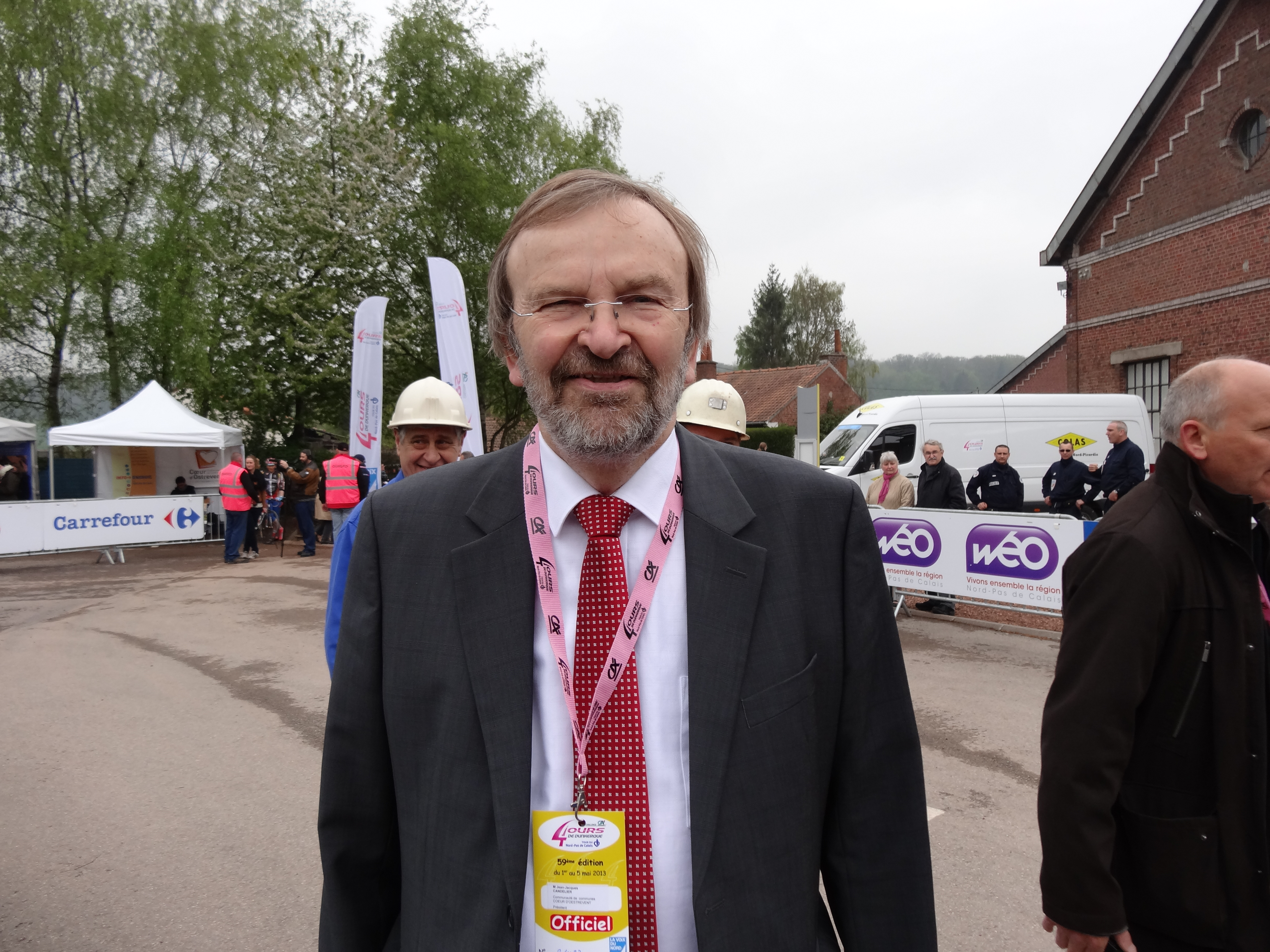
Jean-Jacques Candelier in 2013.

Jean-Jacques Candelier (born 7 March 1945 in Bugnicourt, Nord) is a member of the National Assembly of France. He represents the Nord department, and is a member of the Gauche démocrate et républicaine.

== Biography ==
Jean-Jacques Candelier has been mayor of Bruille-lez-Marchiennes since 1977. He was a member of the Departmental Council of Nord from 1985 to 2008, and president of the Somain-Aniche intermunicipal association and then the Cœur d'Ostrevent community of municipalities from 1983 to 2014.

He was elected deputy on June 17, 2007, for the 13th legislature (2007-2012), in the 16th district of the North, defeating Michelle Derain (Union for a Popular Movement) in the second round with 66.09% of the vote. He thus succeeded Georges Hage (PCF), who did not stand for re-election. He became vice-chairman of the National Defense Committee of the National Assembly (France).

He was re-elected on June 17, 2012, in the second round of the 2012 French legislative election, obtaining 100% of the votes cast; the Socialist candidate who came second in the first round withdrew in his favor.

He did not stand for re-election in the 2017 legislative elections. However, he did stand for re-election in the 2020 municipal elections and was re-elected mayor.

In February 2022, Mediapart published an investigation into Fabien Roussel's role as parliamentary assistant to Jean-Jacques Candelier between 2009 and 2014, raising suspicions about a fictitious job. The former congressman defended Fabien Roussel.
