= Nord's 20th constituency =

Constituency of the National Assembly of France

20th constituency of Nord
- inline Constituency of the National Assembly of France

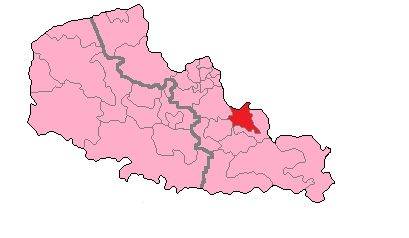
- Nord's 20th Constituency shown within Nord-Pas-de-Calais
- Deputy: Guillaume Florquin; RN
- Department: Nord
- Cantons: Anzin (part), Saint-Amand-les-Eaux-Rive droite, Saint-Amand-les-Eaux-Rive gauche,
- Registered voters: 80,858

The 20th constituency of Nord is a French legislative constituency in the Nord department.

== Description ==
Nord's 20th constituency occupies the areas between the city of Valenciennes and the border with Belgium.

The constituency has historically been a stronghold of the French Communist Party (PCF), and was held by veteran communist Alain Bocquet from 1988 to 2017. It was held by PCF National Secretary and 2022 presidential election candidate Fabien Roussel, until he was defeated by the National Rally candidate Guillaume Florquin in the 2024 French elections, marking the first time the PCF will not represent the constituency since its creation.

== Historic Representation ==
Election	Member	Party
1958	Fernand Duchâteau	SFIO
1962	Henri Fiévez	PCF
1967	Henri Fiévez	PCF
1968	Henri Fiévez	PCF
1973	Gustave Ansart	PCF
1978	Gustave Ansart	PCF
1981	Gustave Ansart	PCF
1986	Proportional representation - no election by constituency	
1988	Alain Bocquet	PCF
1993	Alain Bocquet	PCF
1997	Alain Bocquet	PCF
2002	Alain Bocquet	PCF
2007	Alain Bocquet	PCF
2012	Alain Bocquet	PCF
2017	Fabien Roussel	PCF
2022	Fabien Roussel	PCF
2024	Guillaume Florquin	RN

== Election results ==
=== 2024 ===
Candidate	Party	Alliance	First round			Second round		
Candidate	Party	Alliance	Votes	%	+/–	Votes	%	+/–
Guillaume Florquin	RN		23,852	50.30	+17.68			
Fabien Roussel	PCF	NFP	14,791	31.19	-2.96			
Pierre-Luc Vervandier	MoDem	ENS	5,010	10.57	-4.12			
Élisabeth Gondy	LR		3,087	6.51	N/A			
Dimitri Mozdzierz	LO		679	1.43	+0.68			
Valid votes			47,419	97.75	-0.33			
Blank votes			757	1.56	+0.16			
Null votes			335	0.69	+0.17			
Turnout			48,511	59.02	+19.40			
Abstentions			33,679	40.98	-19.40			
Registered voters			82,190					
Source: Ministry of the Interior, Le Monde
Result						RN GAIN FROM PCF		

=== 2022 ===
Legislative Election 2022: Nord's 20th constituency
Party	Candidate	Votes	%	±%
PCF (NUPÉS)	Fabien Roussel	10,819	34.15	+1.26
RN	Guillaume Florquin	10,334	32.62	+9.97
LREM (Ensemble)	Delphine Alexandre	4,654	14.69	−5.48
LFI	Éric Renaud*	2,757	8.70	N/A
REC	Béatrice Lasserre	1,011	3.19	N/A
PA	Rudy Patel	960	3.03	N/A
Others	N/A	1,144	3.61	
Turnout		31,679	39.62	−1.42
2nd round result
PCF (NUPÉS)	Fabien Roussel	16,439	54.50	-9.38
RN	Guillaume Florquin	13,725	45.50	+9.38
Turnout		30,164	39.48	+1.40
PCF hold				

* LFI dissident

=== 2017 ===
Candidate	Label	First round		Second round	
Candidate	Label	Votes	%	Votes	%
Fabien Roussel	PCF	7,712	23.61	18,633	63.88
Ludovic de Danne	FN	7,397	22.65	10,538	36.12
Daniel Zielinski	REM	6,588	20.17		
Éric Renaud	DVG	3,124	9.56		
David Richer	FI	3,031	9.28		
David Bustin	UDI	1,839	5.63		
Éric Castelain	DVD	1,112	3.40		
Frédéric Bigot	ECO	699	2.14		
Dominique Slabolepszy	EXD	515	1.58		
Bruno Leclercq	EXG	282	0.86		
Thierry Aubert	DVD	209	0.64		
Christelle Carpentier	DIV	156	0.48		
Votes		32,664	100.00	29,171	100.00
Valid votes		32,664	98.13	29,171	94.47
Blank votes		432	1.30	1,196	3.87
Null votes		192	0.58	513	1.66
Turnout		33,288	41.04	30,880	38.08
Abstentions		47,827	58.96	50,223	61.92
Registered voters		81,115		81,103	
Source: Ministry of the Interior

=== 2012 ===
Legislative Election 2012: Nord's 20th constituency
Party	Candidate	Votes	%	±%
PCF (FG)	Alain Bocquet	18,549	46.57	
FN	Nathalie Betegnies	8,654	21.73	
UMP	Monique Huon	5,376	13.50	
PS	Sébastien Urgu	4,946	12.42	
DVD	Gilles Waddington	799	2.01	
Others	N/A	1,510		
Turnout		39,834	49.26	
2nd round result
PCF (FG)	Alain Bocquet	24,762	66.27	
FN	Nathalie Betegnies	12,606	33.73	
Turnout		37,368	46.21	
FG gain from PCF				

=== 2007 ===
Legislative Election 2007: Nord's 20th constituency
Party	Candidate	Votes	%	±%
PCF	Alain Bocquet	21,320	46.49	
UMP	Marie-Thérèse Garcia	9,989	21.78	
PS	Marie-Geneviève Degrandsart	4,170	9.09	
DVD	Eric Castelain	2,890	6.30	
FN	Michelle Beal	2,494	5.44	
MoDem	Françoise Mascotto	1,869	4.08	
Others	N/A	3,129		
Turnout		46,610	56.35	
2nd round result
PCF	Alain Bocquet	29,933	69.17	
UMP	Marie-Thérèse Garcia	13,340	30.83	
Turnout		44,393	53.67	
PCF hold				

=== 2002 ===
Legislative Election 2002: Nord's 20th constituency
Party	Candidate	Votes	%	±%
PCF	Alain Bocquet	18,374	39.58	
UMP	Sylvie Woelffle	9,087	19.57	
FN	Carl Lang	8,663	18.66	
PS	Marie-Geneviève Degrandsart	4,960	10.68	
CPNT	Monique Huon	1,448	3.12	
LV	Luc Coppin	1,328	2.86	
Others	N/A	2,568		
Turnout		47,307	58.78	
2nd round result
PCF	Alain Bocquet	26,904	63.97	
UMP	Sylvie Woelffle	15,150	36.03	
Turnout		43,705	54.51	
PCF hold				

=== 1997 ===
Legislative Election 1997: Nord's 20th constituency
Party	Candidate	Votes	%	±%
PCF	Alain Bocquet	21,228	41.10	
FN	Michelle Beal	10,442	20.22	
PS	Nadine Cochy	7,242	14.02	
RPR	Alexis Massart	7,013	13.58	
GE	Christian Atzori	1,351	2.62	
LO	Jean-Pierre Lecesne	1,314	2.54	
DVD	Michel Benit	1,118	2.16	
Others	N/A	1,946		
Turnout		53,963	69.79	
2nd round result
PCF	Alain Bocquet	32,535	69.33	
FN	Michelle Beal	14,392	30.67	
Turnout		52,763	68.24	
PCF hold				

== Sources ==
- Official results of French elections from 1998: "Résultats électoraux officiels en France" (in French).
