= Bernard Gérard (politician) =

French politician

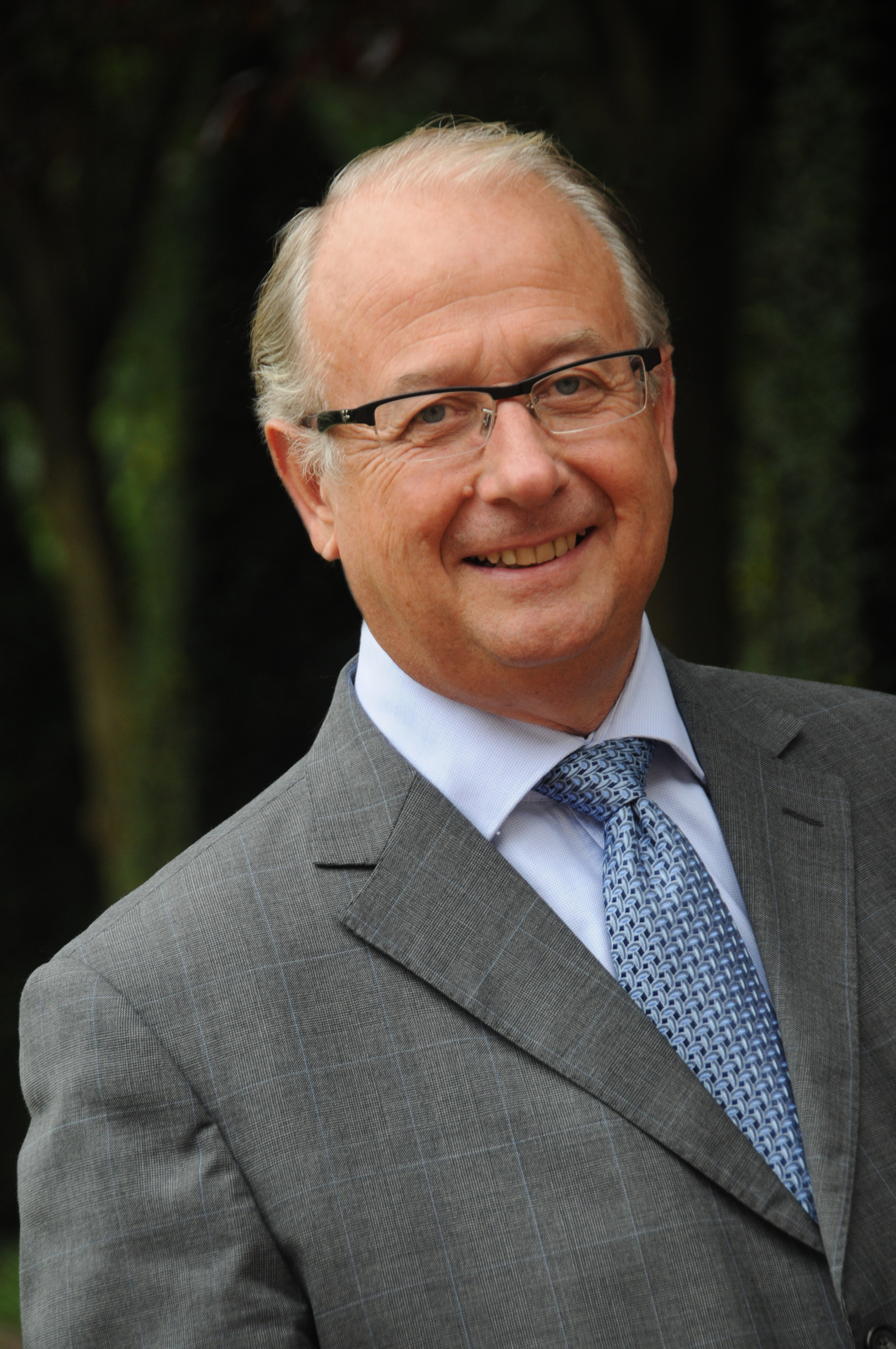
Bernard Gérard

Bernard Gérard (born August 29, 1953) is a member of the National Assembly of France. He represents the Nord department, and is a member of the Union for a Popular Movement.
