= Matthieu Marchio =

French politician

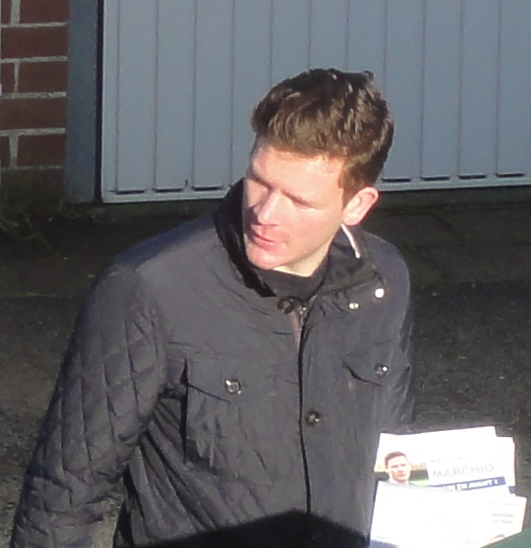

Member of the National Assembly for Nord's 16th constituency
- Incumbent
- Assumed office 22 June 2022
- Preceded by: Alain Bruneel

Personal details
- Born: 8 June 1993 (age 32) Somme, France
- Party: National Rally
- Occupation: Politician, real estate agent

Matthieu Marchio (born 8 June 1993) is a French politician of the National Rally and a Member of the National Assembly for Nord's 16th constituency.

Marchio was head of the Somain Let's Dare to Change list for the municipal elections in France in June 2020 and was elected as a municipal councillor. For the 2022 French legislative election, he contested Nord's 16th constituency for the National Rally and won the seat in the second round defeating French Communist Party deputy Alain Bruneel.
