= Violette Spillebout =

French politician (born 1972)

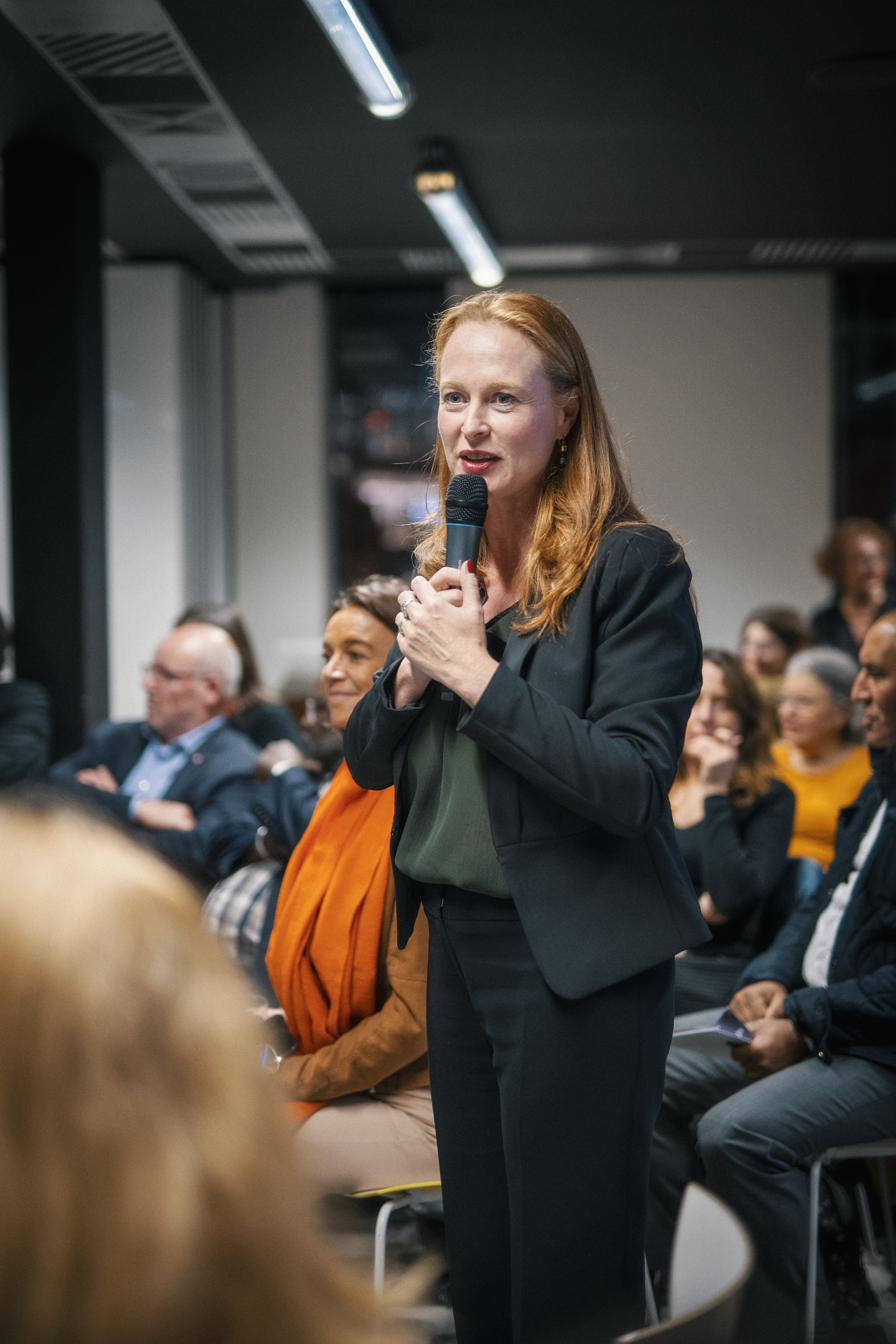
- Violette Spillebout in 2022

Member of the National Assembly for Nord's 9th constituency
- Incumbent
- Assumed office 21 June 2022
- Preceded by: Valérie Petit

Personal details
- Born: 2 September 1972 (age 54) Lyon, France
- Party: En Marche!
- Other political affiliations: Ensemble

Violette Spillebout (born 2 September 1972) is a French politician from En Marche! (Ensemble). She has been member of the National Assembly for Nord's 9th constituency since 2022.

== See also ==
- List of deputies of the 16th National Assembly of France
