= Nord (French department) =

Department of France

- Department
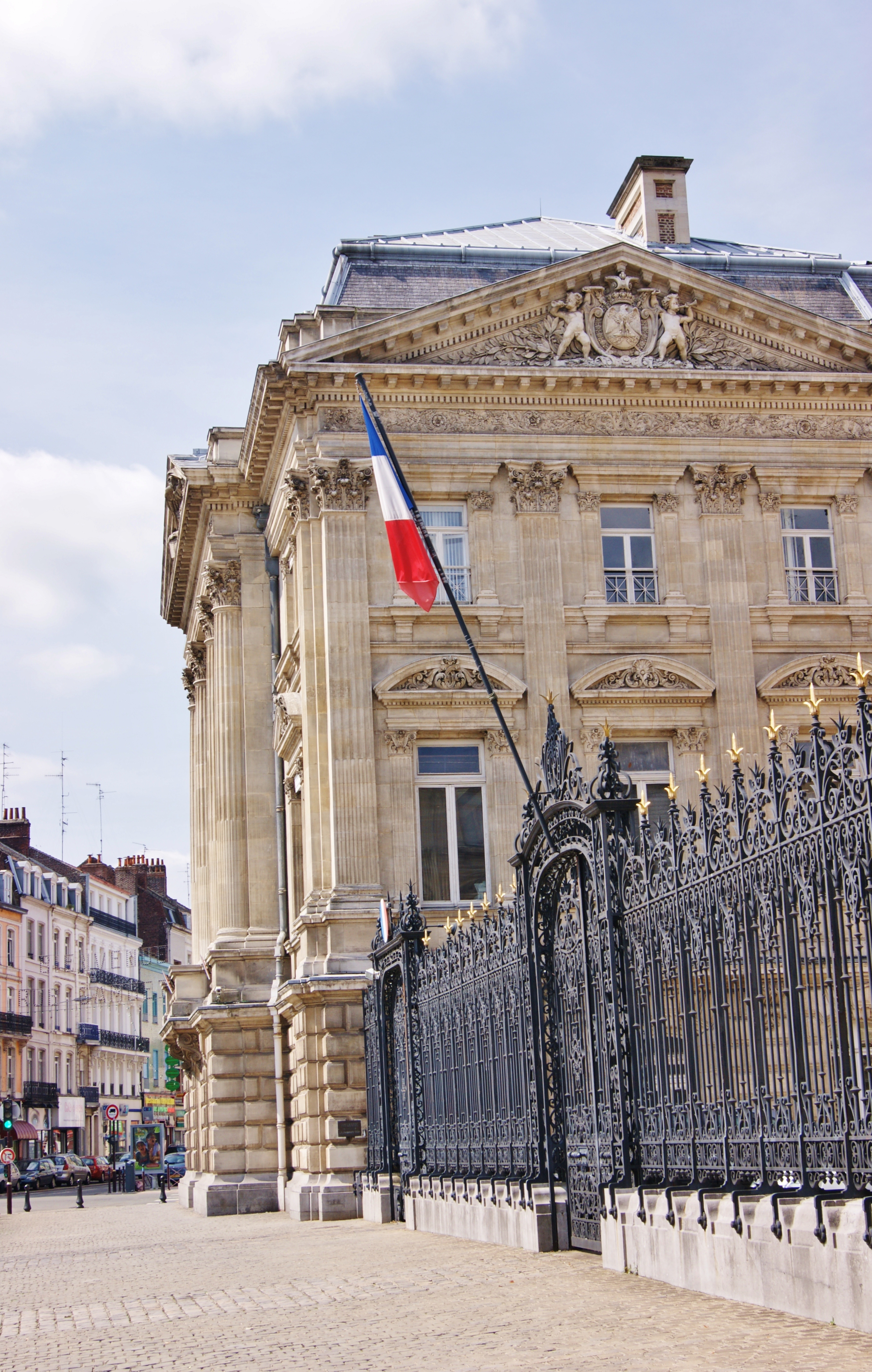
- Prefecture building of the Nord department, in Lille

- Flag Coat of arms

- Location of Nord in France
- Coordinates: 50°23′N 03°19′E
- Country: France
- Region: Hauts-de-France
- Prefecture: Lille
- Subprefectures: Avesnes- sur-Helpe; Cambrai; Douai; Dunkirk; Valenciennes

Government
  - President of the Departmental Council: Christian Poiret

Area^{1}
  - Total: 5,743 km^{2} (2,217 sq mi)

Population (2023)
  - Total: 2,615,635
  - Rank: 1st
  - Density: 455.4/km^{2} (1,180/sq mi)
- Time zone: UTC+1 (CET)
  - Summer (DST): UTC+2 (CEST)
- ISO 3166 code: FR-59
- Department number: 59
- Arrondissements: 6
- Cantons: 41
- Communes: 647
- ^1 French Land Register data, which exclude estuaries, and lakes, ponds, and glaciers larger than 1 km^{2}

Nord (French pronunciation: [nɔʁ]; officially French: Département du Nord; Picard: Départémint dech Nord; Dutch: Noorderdepartement, lit. 'northern department') is a department in Hauts-de-France region in France, bordering Belgium. It was created from the western halves of the historical counties of Flanders and Hainaut, and the Bishopric of Cambrai. The modern coat of arms was inherited from the County of Flanders.

Nord is the country's most populous département. It had a population of 2,615,635 in 2023. It also contains the metropolitan region of Lille (the main city and the prefecture of the département), the fourth-largest urban area in France after Paris, Lyon and Marseille. The department is the part of France where the French Flemish dialect of Dutch has historically been spoken as a native language. Similarly, the distinct French Picard dialect Ch'ti is spoken there.

== History ==
Until the 17th century, the history of the North (Nord, French department) was largely in common with the history of Belgium (the Celtics Belgians during Antiquity were a multitude of Celtic peoples from the north of Gaul). The historical French provinces that preceded Nord are French Flanders, French Hainaut (part of Hainaut and Flanders is in the Kingdom of Belgium). Tribes of the Belgae, such as the Menapii and Nervii were the first peoples recorded in the area later known as Nord.

During the 4th and 5th Centuries, Roman rulers of Gallia Belgica secured the route from the major port of Bononia (Boulogne) to Colonia (Cologne), by co-opting Germanic peoples north-east of this corridor, such as the Tungri. In effect, the area known later as Nord became an isogloss (linguistic border) between the Germanic and Romance languages. Saxon colonisation of the region from the 5th to the 8th centuries likely shifted the isogloss further south so that, by the 9th century, most people immediately north of Lille spoke a dialect of Old Dutch. This has remained evident in the place names of the region. After the County of Flanders became part of France in the 9th century, the isogloss moved north and east.

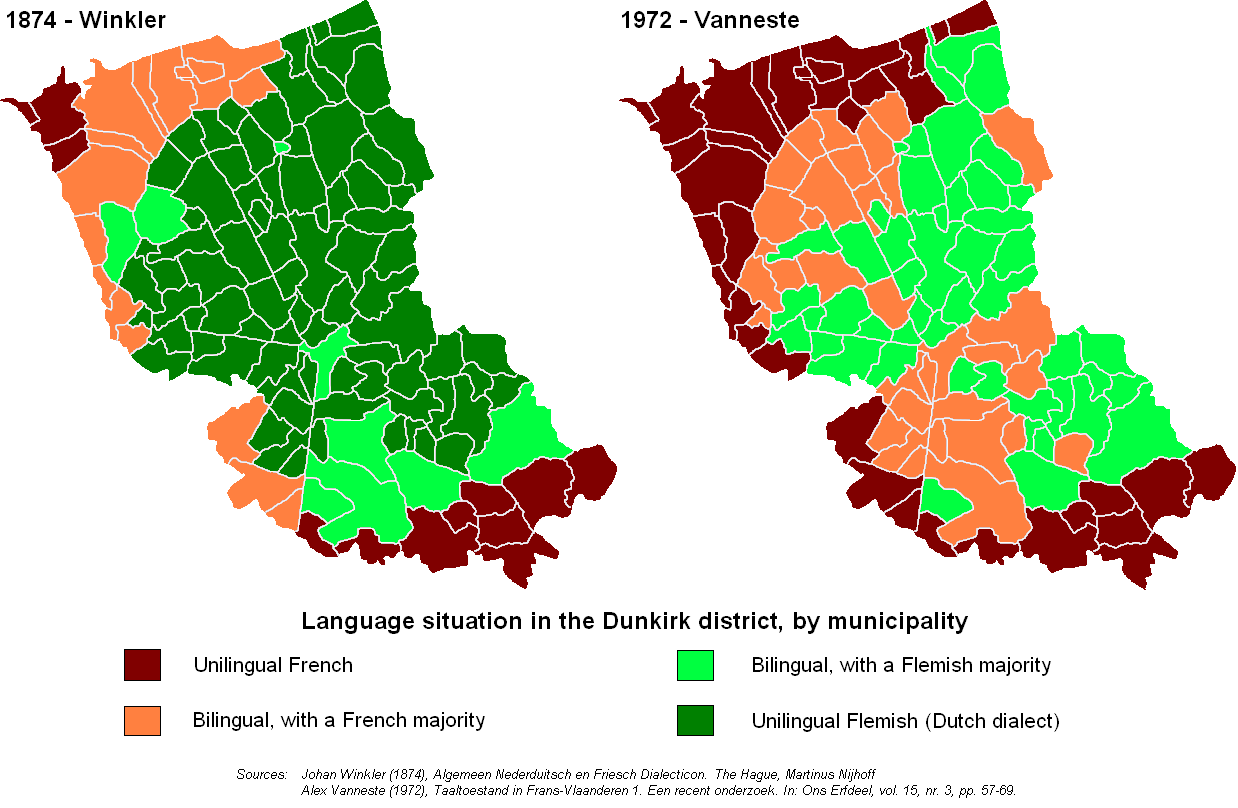
Extent of West Flemish spoken in the arrondissement of Dunkirk in 1874 and 1972 respectively.

During the 14th century, much of the area came under the control of the Duchy of Burgundy and in subsequent centuries was therefore part of the Habsburg Netherlands (from 1482) and the Spanish Netherlands (1581).

Areas that later constituted Nord were ceded to France by treaties in 1659, 1668, and 1678, becoming the Counties of Flanders and Hainaut, and part of the Bishopric of Cambrai.

On 4 March 1790, during the French Revolution, Nord became one of the original 83 departments created to replace the counties.

Modern government policies making French the only official language have led to a decline in use of the Dutch West Flemish dialect. There are currently 20,000 speakers of a sub-dialect of West Flemish in the arrondissement of Dunkirk and it appears likely that this particular sub-dialect will be extinct within decades.

== Geography ==
Nord is part of the current Hauts-de-France region and is surrounded by the French departments of Pas-de-Calais, Somme, and Aisne, as well as by Belgium and the North Sea. Its area is 5,742.8 km^{2} (2,217.3 sq mi). It is the longest department in metropolitan France, measuring 184 km from Fort-Philippe in the north-west to Anor in the south-east.

Situated in the north of the country along the western half of the Belgian frontier, the department is unusually long and narrow. The principal rivers are the following: Yser, Lys, Escaut, Scarpe, Sambre.

=== Principal towns ===
The most populous commune is Lille, the prefecture. With nearby Roubaix, Tourcoing and Villeneuve-d'Ascq, it constitutes the center of a cluster of industrial and former mining towns totalling slightly over a million inhabitants. As of 2023, there are 10 communes with more than 30,000 inhabitants:

Commune	Population (2023)
Lille	238,246
Tourcoing	98,772
Roubaix	98,286
Dunkirk	86,263
Villeneuve-d'Ascq	62,868
Valenciennes	43,468
Wattrelos	40,847
Douai	40,250
Marcq-en-Barœul	40,184
Cambrai	31,134

== Demographics ==
Historical population

Year	Pop.	±% p.a.
1801	765,001	—
1806	839,530	+1.88%
1821	905,777	+0.51%
1831	989,938	+0.89%
1841	1,085,298	+0.92%
1851	1,158,285	+0.65%
1861	1,303,380	+1.19%
1872	1,447,764	+0.96%
1881	1,603,259	+1.14%
1891	1,736,341	+0.80%
1901	1,866,994	+0.73%
1911	1,961,780	+0.50%
1921	1,787,918	−0.92%
1931	2,029,449	+1.28%

Year	Pop.	±% p.a.
1936	2,022,167	−0.07%
1946	1,917,452	−0.53%
1954	2,098,545	+1.13%
1962	2,293,112	+1.11%
1968	2,417,899	+0.89%
1975	2,511,478	+0.54%
1982	2,520,526	+0.05%
1990	2,531,855	+0.06%
1999	2,555,020	+0.10%
2007	2,564,950	+0.05%
2012	2,587,128	+0.17%
2017	2,604,361	+0.13%
2023	2,615,635	+0.07%

Sources:SPLAF and INSEE

== Politics ==
The President of the Departmental Council is the unaffiliated right-winger Christian Poiret.

The first President of the Fifth Republic, General Charles de Gaulle, was born in Lille in the department on 22 November 1890.

Party	Seats
Union of the Right (UD)	30
Union of the Left (UG)	18
Miscellaneous right (DVD)	10
Union of the Centre and the Right (UCD)	8
French Communist Party (PCF)	4
Miscellaneous left (DVG)	4
Union of the Left and Ecologists (UGE)	4
Miscellaneous centre (DVC)	2
Europe Ecology – The Greens (EELV)	2

=== Presidential elections second round ===
Election	Winning candidate	Party	%	2nd place candidate	Party	%
2022	Emmanuel Macron	LREM	52.85	Marine Le Pen	RN	47.15
2017	Emmanuel Macron	LREM	56.90	Marine Le Pen	FN	43.10
2012	François Hollande	PS	52.88	Nicolas Sarkozy	UMP	47.12
2007	Nicolas Sarkozy	UMP	51.75	Ségolène Royal	PS	48.25
2002	Jacques Chirac	RPR	78.28	Jean-Marie Le Pen	FN	21.72
1995	Lionel Jospin	PS	53.70	Jacques Chirac	RPR	46.30

=== Current National Assembly Representatives ===
Constituency	Member	Party
Nord's 1st constituency	Aurélien Le Coq	La France Insoumise
Nord's 2nd constituency	Ugo Bernalicis	La France Insoumise
Nord's 3rd constituency	Sandra Delannoy	National Rally
Nord's 4th constituency	Brigitte Liso	Renaissance
Nord's 5th constituency	Sébastien Huyghe	Renaissance
Nord's 6th constituency	Charlotte Lecocq	Renaissance
Nord's 7th constituency	Félicie Gérard	Horizons
Nord's 8th constituency	David Guiraud	La France Insoumise
Nord's 9th constituency	Violette Spillebout	Renaissance
Nord's 10th constituency	Gérald Darmanin	Renaissance
Nord's 11th constituency	Roger Vicot	Socialist Party
Nord's 12th constituency	Michaël Taverne	National Rally
Nord's 13th constituency	Julien Gokel	Socialist Party
Nord's 14th constituency	Paul Christophe	Horizons
Nord's 15th constituency	Jean-Pierre Bataille	Miscellaneous right
Nord's 16th constituency	Matthieu Marchio	National Rally
Nord's 17th constituency	Thierry Tesson	Union of the Right for the Republic
Nord's 18th constituency	Alexandre Dufosset	National Rally
Nord's 19th constituency	Sébastien Chenu	National Rally
Nord's 20th constituency	Guillaume Florquin	National Rally
Nord's 21st constituency	Valérie Létard	Union of Democrats and Independents

== Economy ==
Until recently, the department was dominated economically by coal mining, which extended through the heart of the department from neighbouring Artois into central Belgium.

At the forefront of France's 19th century industrialisation, the area suffered severely during World War I and now faces the economic, social and environmental problems associated with the decline of coal mining with its neighbours, following the earlier decline of the Lille-Roubaix textile industry.

== Transport ==
The department is served by Lille Airport, provides scheduled air service to several cities in France, Europe and some North African countries. However, other airports such as Brussels Airport, and Paris's Charles de Gaulle Airport and Orly Airport are also used by air travellers from the department.

== Tourism ==
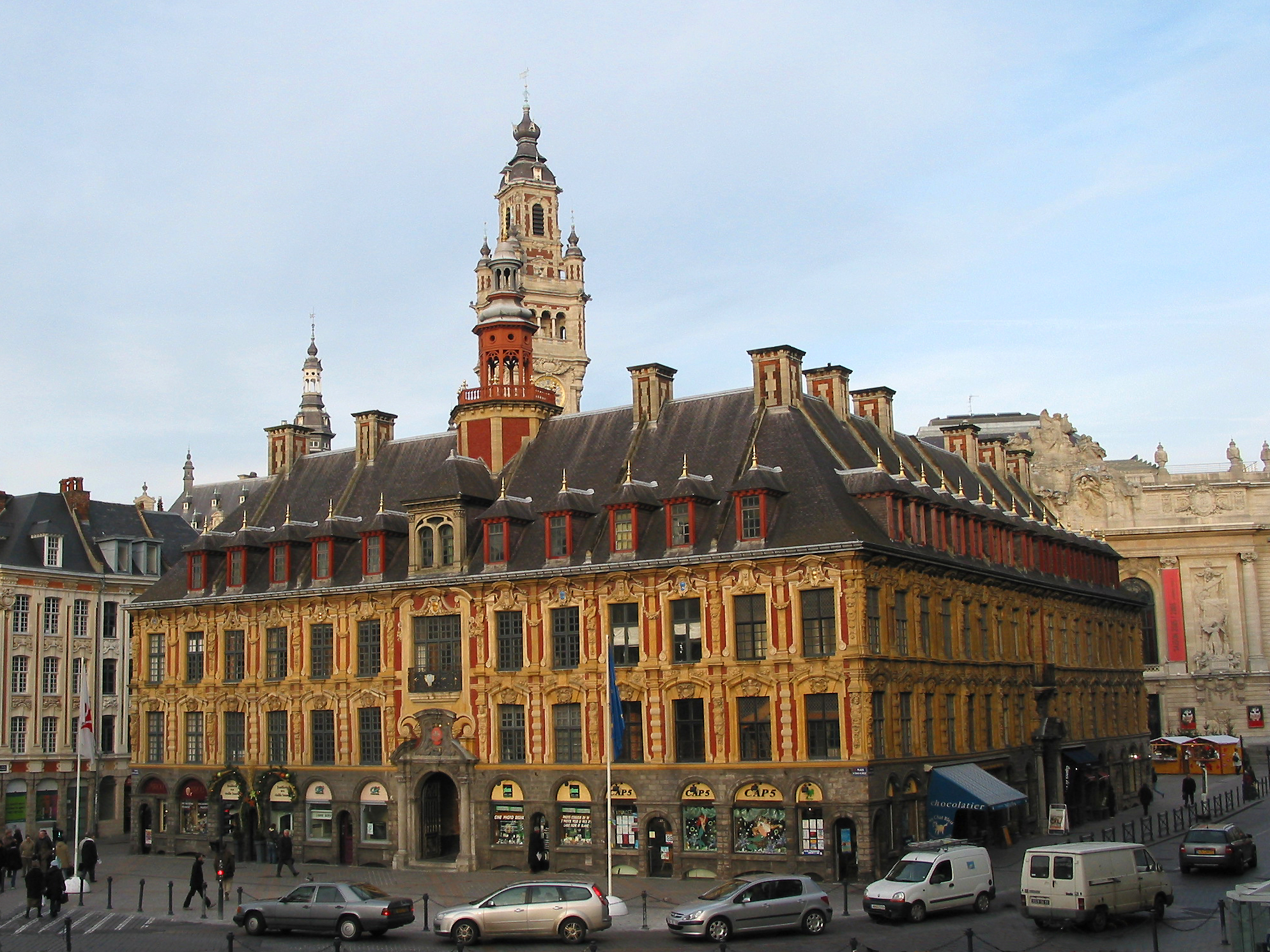
The old stock exchange of Lille

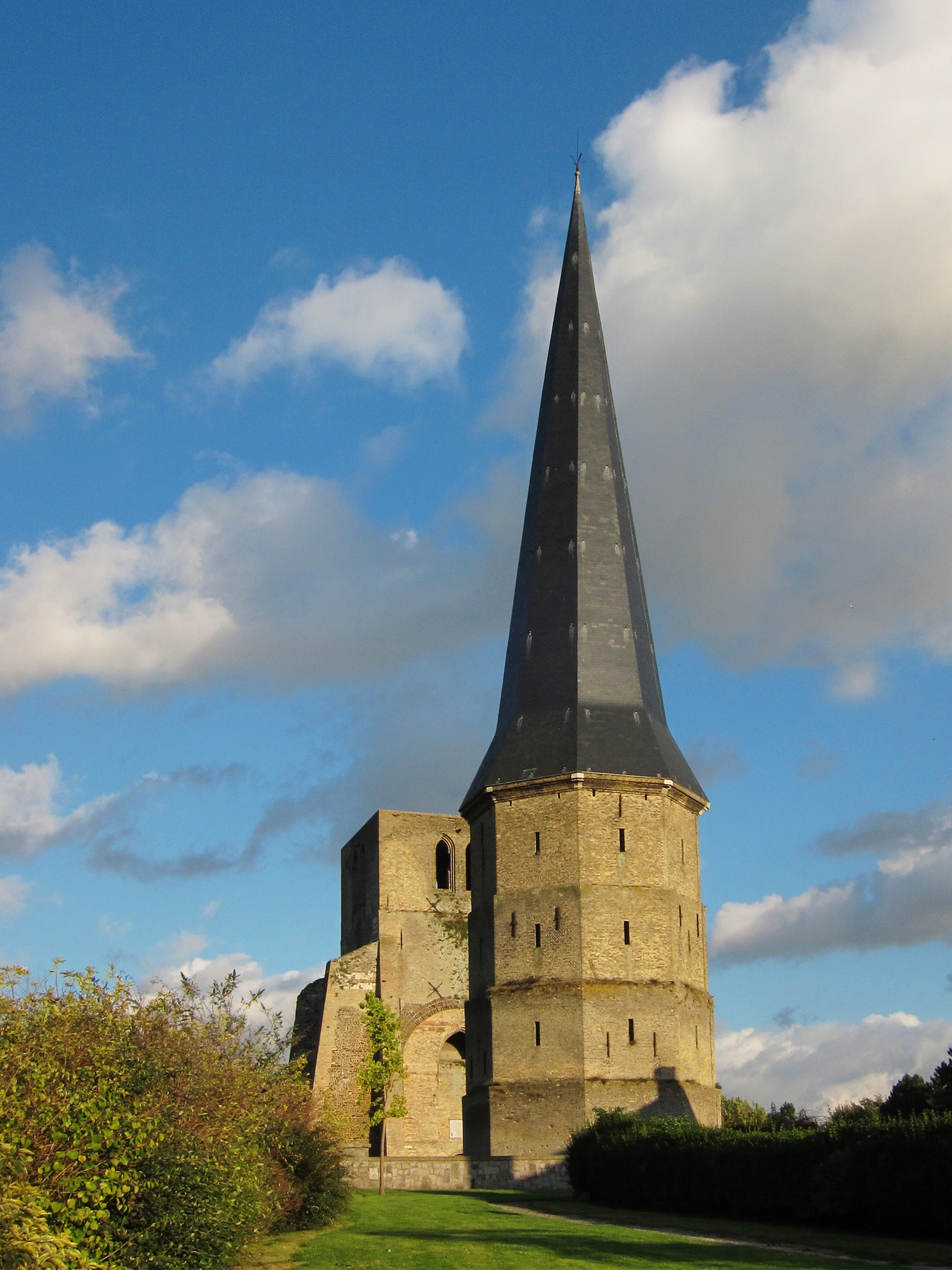
Saint-Winoc Abbey in Bergues

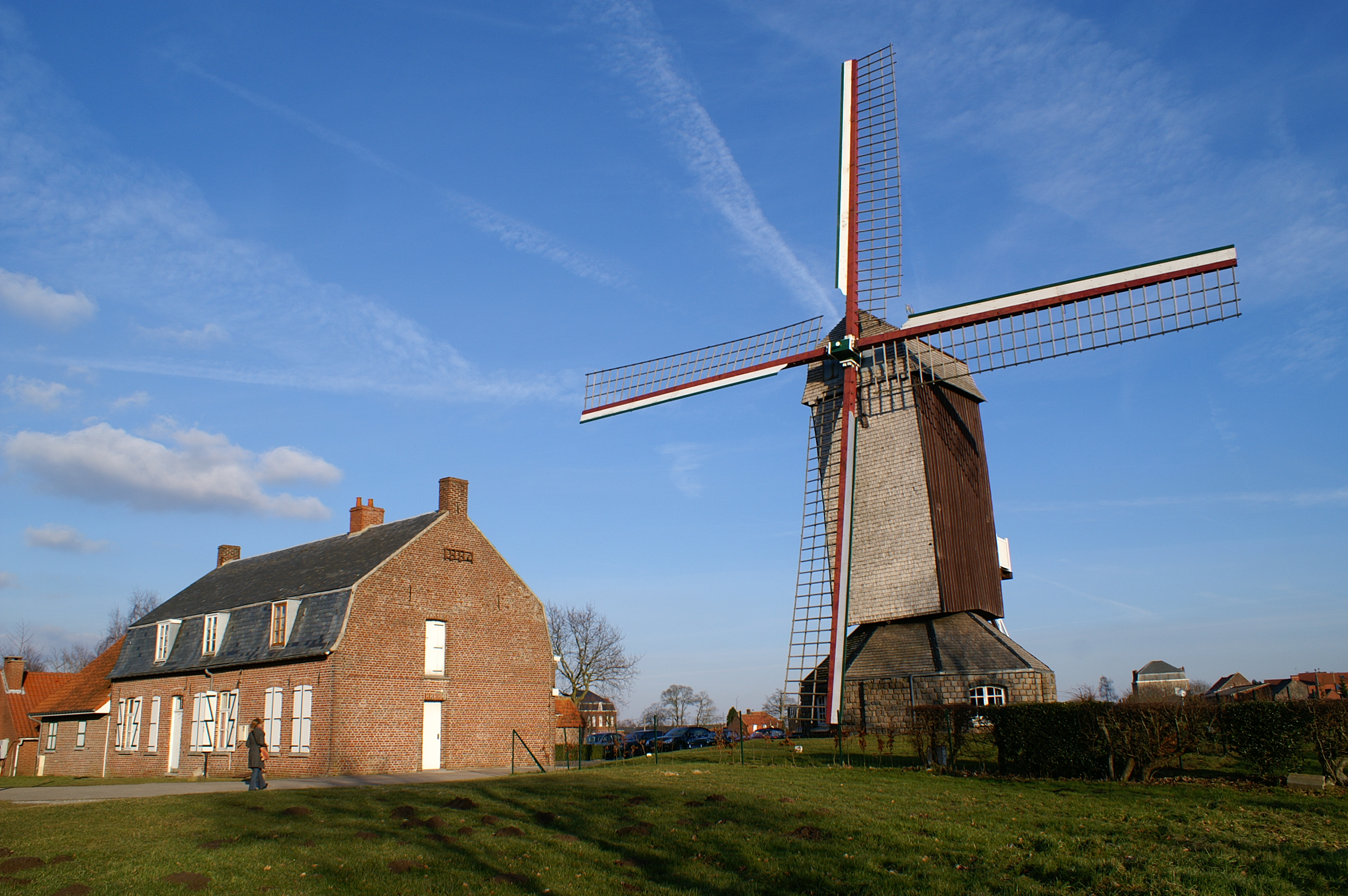
Windmill in Boeschepe

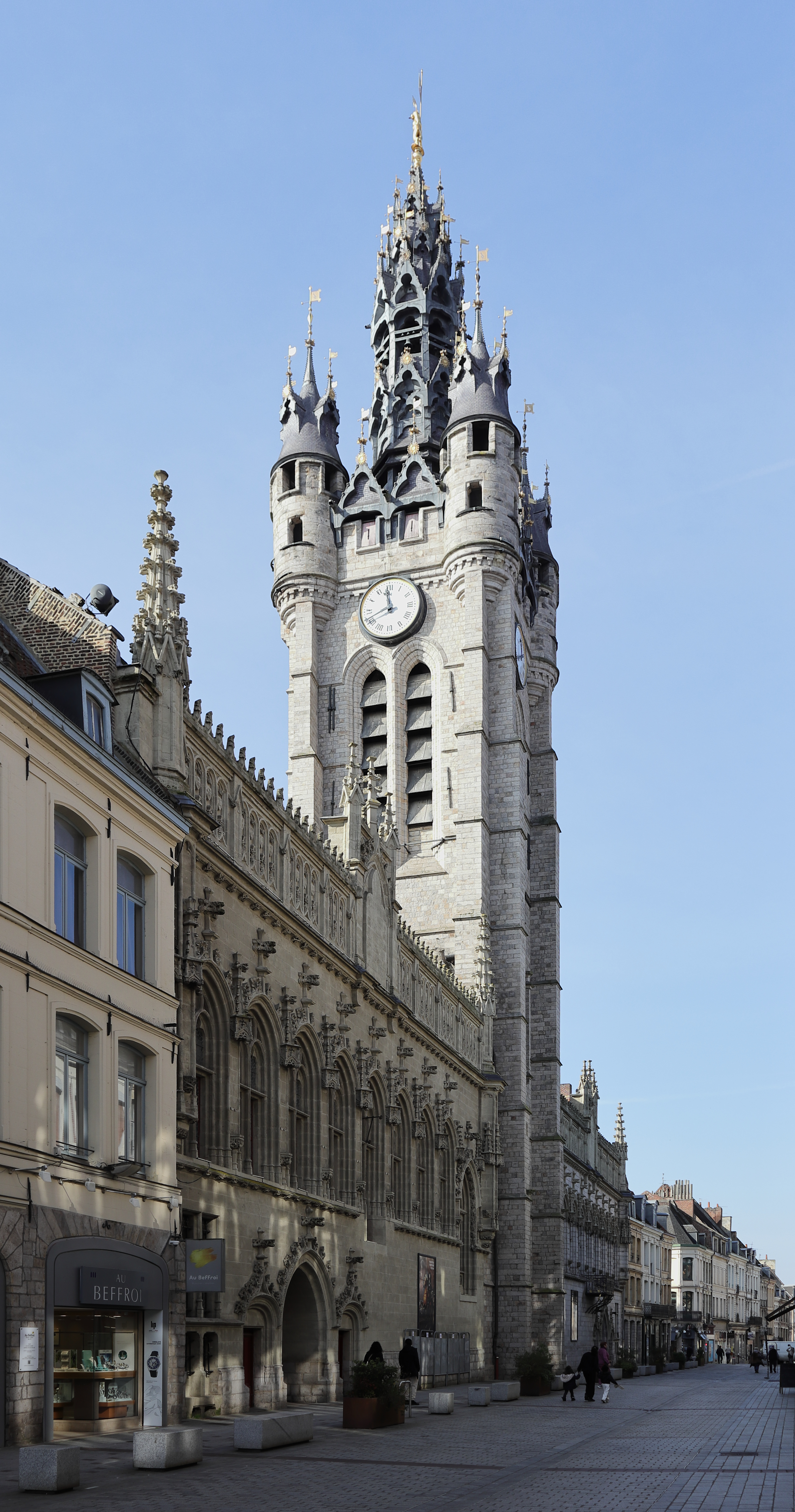
Belfry of Douai

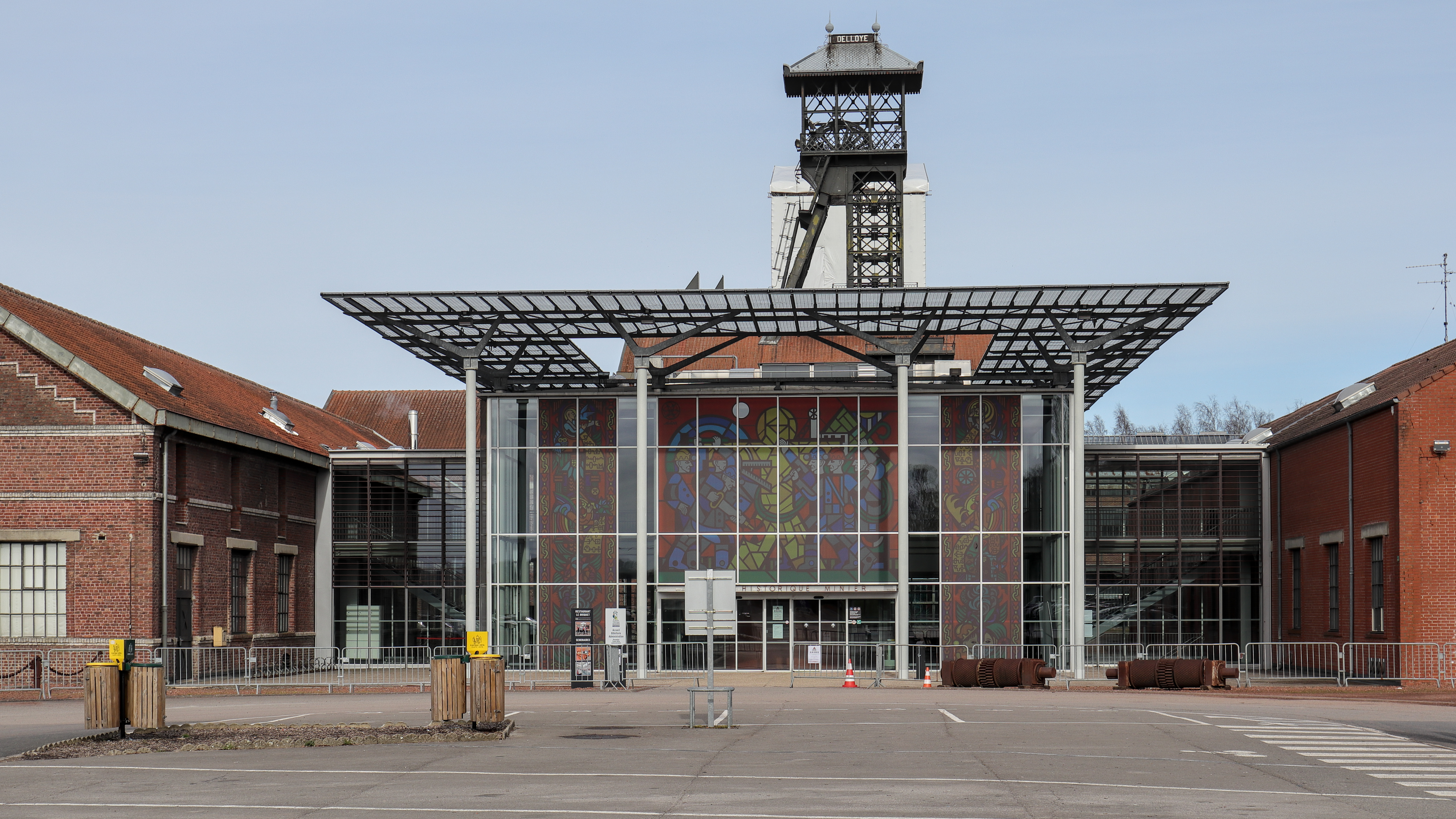
Mining museum in Lewarde

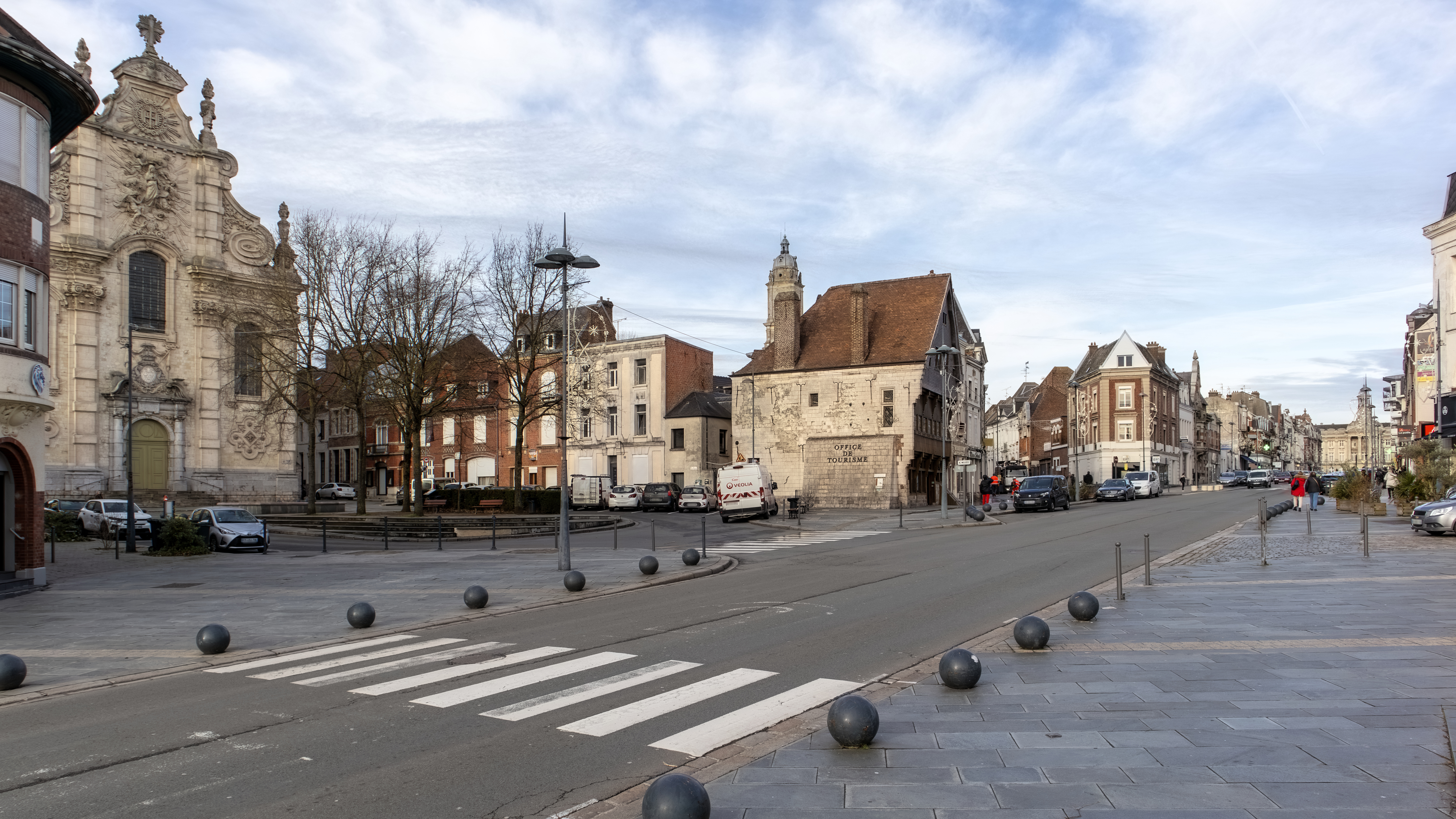
Cambrai

== See also ==
- Cantons of the Nord department
- Communes of the Nord department
- Arrondissements of the Nord department (France)
- French Flemish
- Université Lille Nord de France
