= Denain =

- Commune
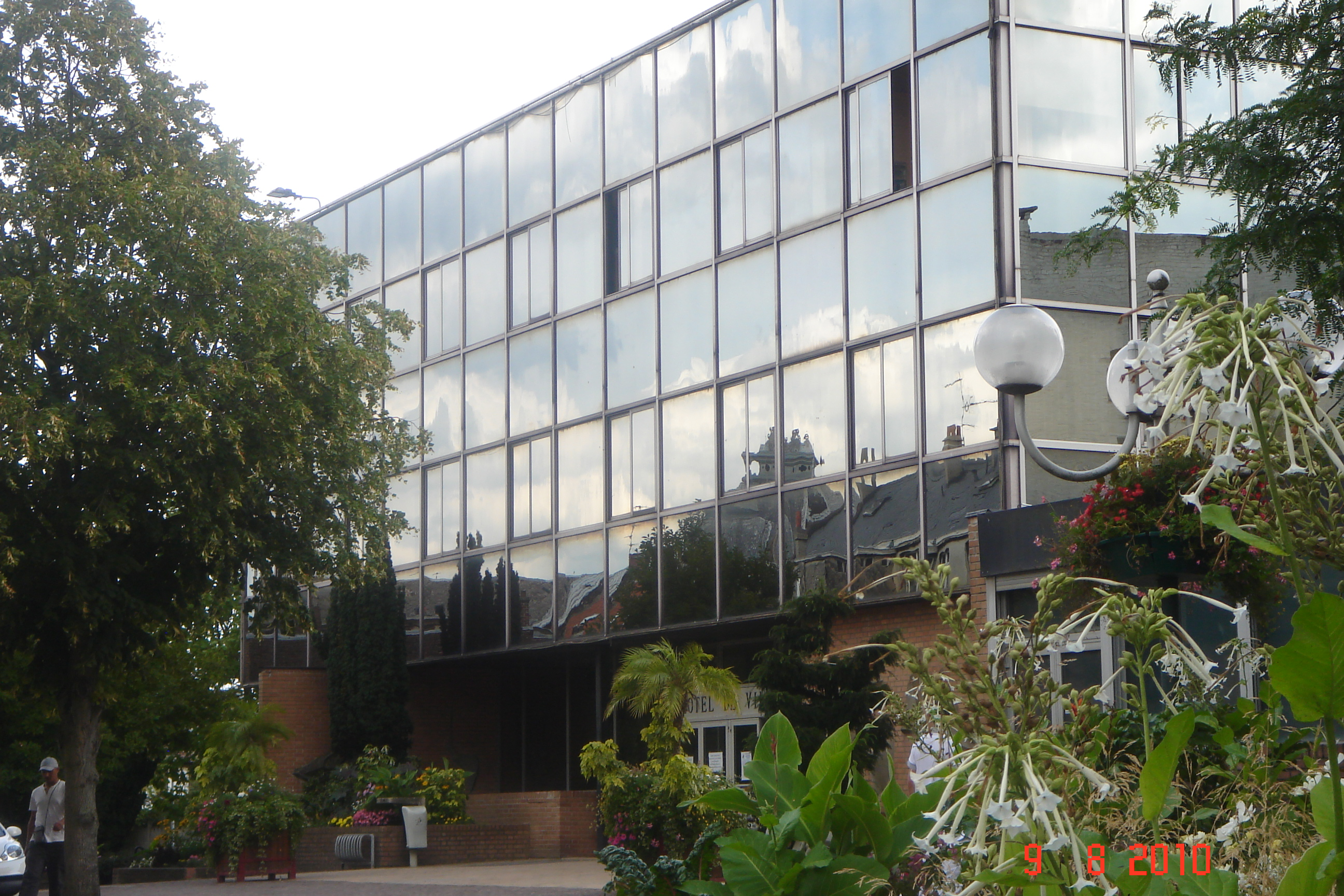
- The Hôtel de Ville

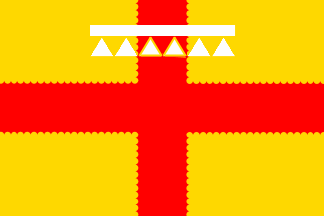
- Flag Coat of arms
- Location of Denain
- Location within France Location within Hauts-de-France
- Coordinates: 50°19′46″N 3°23′45″E
- Country: France
- Region: Hauts-de-France
- Department: Nord
- Arrondissement: Valenciennes
- Canton: Denain
- Intercommunality: CA Porte du Hainaut

Government
  - Mayor (2020–2026): Anne-Lise Dufour-Tonini
- Area^{1}: 11.52 km^{2} (4.45 sq mi)
- Elevation: 33 m (108 ft)
- Highest elevation: 115 m (377 ft)
- Lowest elevation: 26 m (85 ft)
- Population (2023): 20,665
  - Density: 1,794/km^{2} (4,646/sq mi)
- Time zone: UTC+01:00 (CET)
  - Summer (DST): UTC+02:00 (CEST)
- INSEE/Postal code: 59172 /59220
- ^{1} French Land Register data, which excludes lakes, ponds, glaciers > 1 km^{2} (0.386 sq mi or 247 acres) and river estuaries.

Denain (French pronunciation: [dənɛ̃]; Picard: Dnain) is a commune in the Nord department in northern France. As of 2023, the population of the commune was 20,665, on a land area of 11.52 km^{2} (4.448 sq mi).

It is the largest of 47 communes which comprise the Communauté d'agglomération de la Porte du Hainaut, which in 2017 had a total population of 158,754.

== History ==
A mere village in the beginning of the 19th century, its population rapidly increased from 1850 until 1962, when it had 29,467 inhabitants. Since then its population declined by about 30%.

Its vicinity was the scene of the decisive victory gained in 1712 by Marshal Villars over the allies commanded by Prince Eugene of Savoy; and the battlefield is marked by a monolithic monument inscribed with the verses of Voltaire: "Regardez dans Denain l'audacieux Villars/Disputant le tonnerre à l'aigle des Césars." ("See in Denain bold Villars/Fighting the eagle of the Caesars").

Denain was an important centre in the industrial revolution, first for coal-mining from 1720, and steelworks from around 1839. The closure of the large Usinor steelworks at Denain was announced in 1978, and the works finally closed in 1988. Émile Zola is thought to have conducted research into the working of the mine and mining communities by visiting Denain before writing Germinal. A primary school, a park and a road in Denain bear the name of the novelist.

The Hôtel de Ville was completed in around 1980.

Former mayor Patrick Roy was also a deputy and became famous for the support for heavy metal music he expressed at the National Assembly on various occasions.

== Population ==
Historical population

Year	Pop.	±% p.a.
1800	927	—
1806	1,057	+2.21%
1821	1,262	+1.19%
1831	1,601	+2.41%
1836	3,200	+14.86%
1841	5,144	+9.96%
1846	7,272	+7.17%
1851	8,691	+3.63%
1856	9,496	+1.79%
1861	10,254	+1.55%
1866	11,022	+1.45%
1872	12,330	+1.89%
1876	14,419	+3.99%
1881	17,202	+3.59%
1886	17,832	+0.72%
1891	18,258	+0.47%
1896	19,916	+1.75%
1901	23,204	+3.10%

Year	Pop.	±% p.a.
1906	24,564	+1.15%
1911	26,800	+1.76%
1921	23,472	−1.32%
1926	26,868	+2.74%
1931	27,767	+0.66%
1936	26,478	−0.95%
1946	24,908	−0.61%
1954	27,449	+1.22%
1962	29,467	+0.89%
1968	27,973	−0.86%
1975	26,204	−0.93%
1982	21,825	−2.58%
1990	19,544	−1.37%
1999	20,360	+0.46%
2007	20,186	−0.11%
2012	20,270	+0.08%
2017	19,825	−0.44%
2023	20,665	+0.69%

Source: EHESS and INSEE (1968-2023)

== Heraldry ==
The arms of Denain are blazoned :
Or, a cross engrailed gules. (Artres, Bettrechies, Cerfontaine, Eth, Lesquin, Obies, Quérénaing, Semousies, Wambrechies and Warlaing use the same arms.)

== Notable residents ==
- Fabien Gilot (born 1984), Olympic and world champion swimmer
- Philippe and Hervé Lomprez, founders of the cold wave band Trisomie 21 in the early 1980s.

== See also ==
- Battle of Denain
- Communes of the Nord department
