= Olivier Henno =

French politician

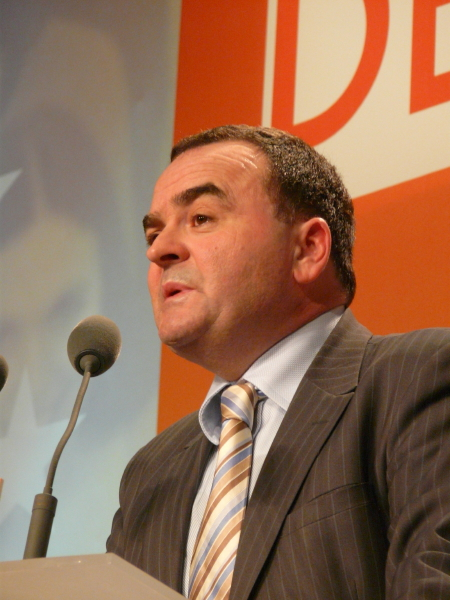

Olivier Henno (born 21 April 1962 in Roubaix) is a French politician, mayor of Saint-André-lez-Lille and a member of the MoDem.

== Biography ==
A member of the Union for French Democracy (UDF), he was elected mayor of Saint-André-lez-Lille in 2001 with almost 52% of the vote, as well as general councillor and a member of the Urban Community of Lille Métropole.

In 2005, Olivier Henno created the surprise in a by-election where he managed to place former UMP deputy and former minister Marc-Philippe Daubresse in a difficult runoff. Henno lost the runoff with a bit over 46% of the vote.

He joined François Bayrou's MoDem in 2007.

Running again in the Nord's 4th constituency during the 2007 French legislative election, he did not manage to create another surprise and placed third in the first round with 18.09%, behind the Socialist candidate (21.49%) and far behind Marc-Philippe Daubresse (46.77%).

He was re-elected mayor of Saint-André-lez-Lille in 2008 with over 65% of the votes in the first round against a UMP and PS list.

In 2009, he was selected to be the MoDem's candidate in Nord-Pas-de-Calais for the 2010 regional elections.
