= Wambrechies =

Wambrechies Wemmersijs
- Commune
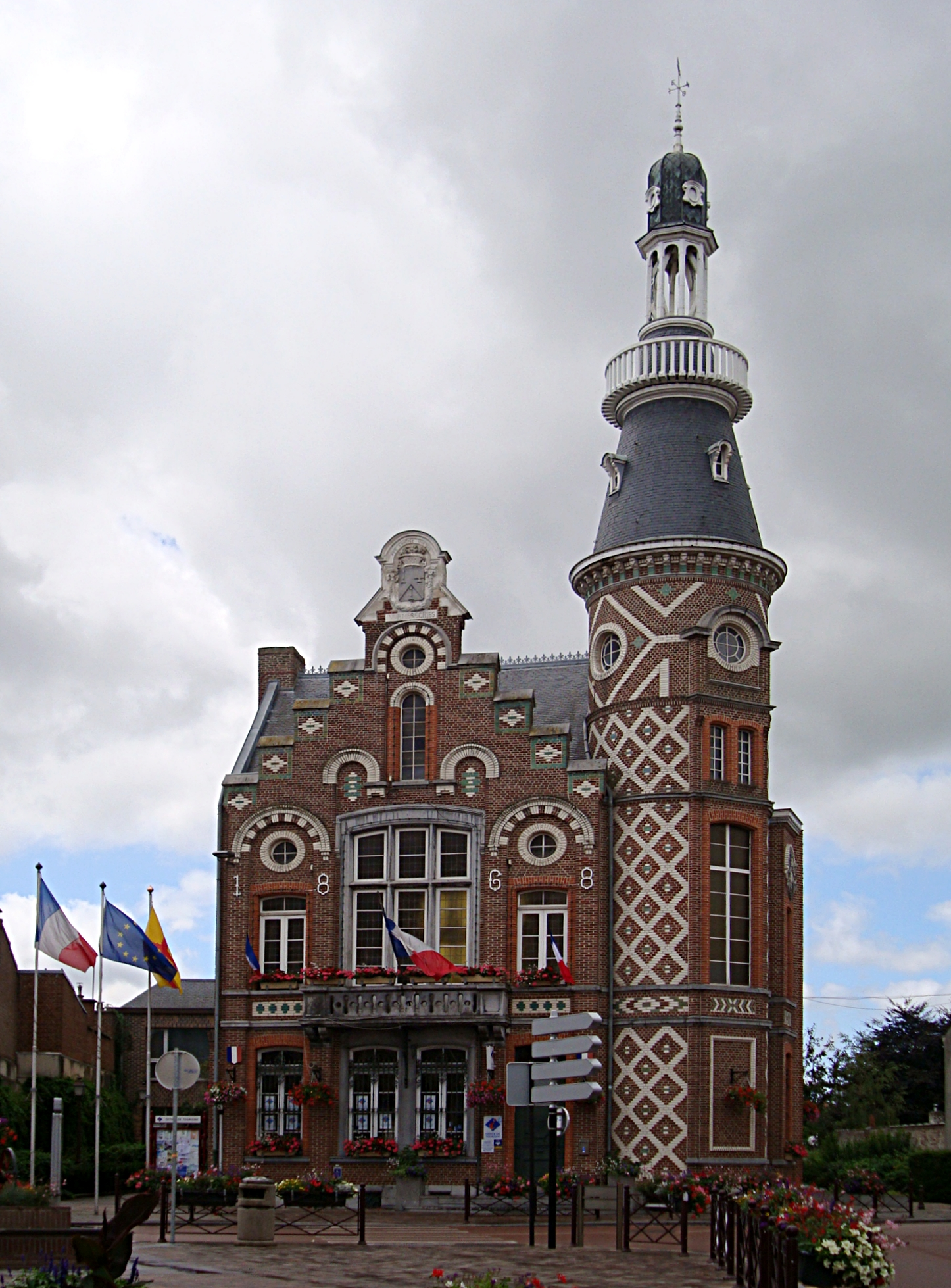
- The town hall in Wambrechies

- Coat of arms
- Location of Wambrechies
- Location within France Location within Hauts-de-France
- Coordinates: 50°41′10″N 3°02′58″E
- Country: France
- Region: Hauts-de-France
- Department: Nord
- Arrondissement: Lille
- Canton: Lille-1
- Intercommunality: Métropole Européenne de Lille

Government
  - Mayor (2020–2026): Sébastien Brogniart
- Area^{1}: 16 km^{2} (6.2 sq mi)
- Elevation: 20 m (66 ft)
- Highest elevation: 26 m (85 ft)
- Lowest elevation: 13 m (43 ft)
- Population (2023): 11,012
  - Density: 690/km^{2} (1,800/sq mi)
- Time zone: UTC+01:00 (CET)
  - Summer (DST): UTC+02:00 (CEST)
- INSEE/Postal code: 59636 /59118
- ^{1} French Land Register data, which excludes lakes, ponds, glaciers > 1 km^{2} (0.386 sq mi or 247 acres) and river estuaries.

Wambrechies (French pronunciation: [wɑ̃bʁəʃi]; West Flemish: Wemmersijs; Picard: Vamberchi) is a commune in the Nord department, in the region Hauts-de-France, in northern France. It is part of the European Metropolis of Lille.

== Geography ==
Wambrechies is situated to the north of Lille, it is bordered by the neighbouring communes of Marquette-lez-Lille (to the southeast), Saint André-lez-Lille (to the south), Quesnoy-sur-Deûle (to the northwest) and Bondues (to the northeast). The Deûle canal runs from north to south through the town.

== Heraldry ==
Arms of Wambrechies	The arms of Wambrechies are blazoned : Or, a cross engrailed gules. (Artres, Bettrechies, Cerfontaine, Eth, Lesquin, Obies, Quérénaing, Semousies, Wambrechies and Warlaing use the same arms.)

== Population ==
Historical population
Year	Pop.	±% p.a.
1968	5,845	—
1975	7,894	+4.39%
1982	8,152	+0.46%
1990	8,250	+0.15%
1999	8,552	+0.40%
2007	9,875	+1.81%
2012	9,665	−0.43%
2017	10,948	+2.52%
2023	11,012	+0.10%
Source: INSEE

== Twin towns ==
Kempen, Germany since 1972.

== See also ==
- Communes of the Nord department
