= Cerfontaine =

Cerfontaine may refer to:

- Cerfontaine, Belgium, a municipality located in the province of Namur
- Cerfontaine, Nord, a commune of the Nord département in northern France
- Gerlach Cerfontaine, CEO of Schiphol Group, the 100% shareholder of Schiphol Airport in the Netherlands
