= Ugo Bernalicis =

French politician

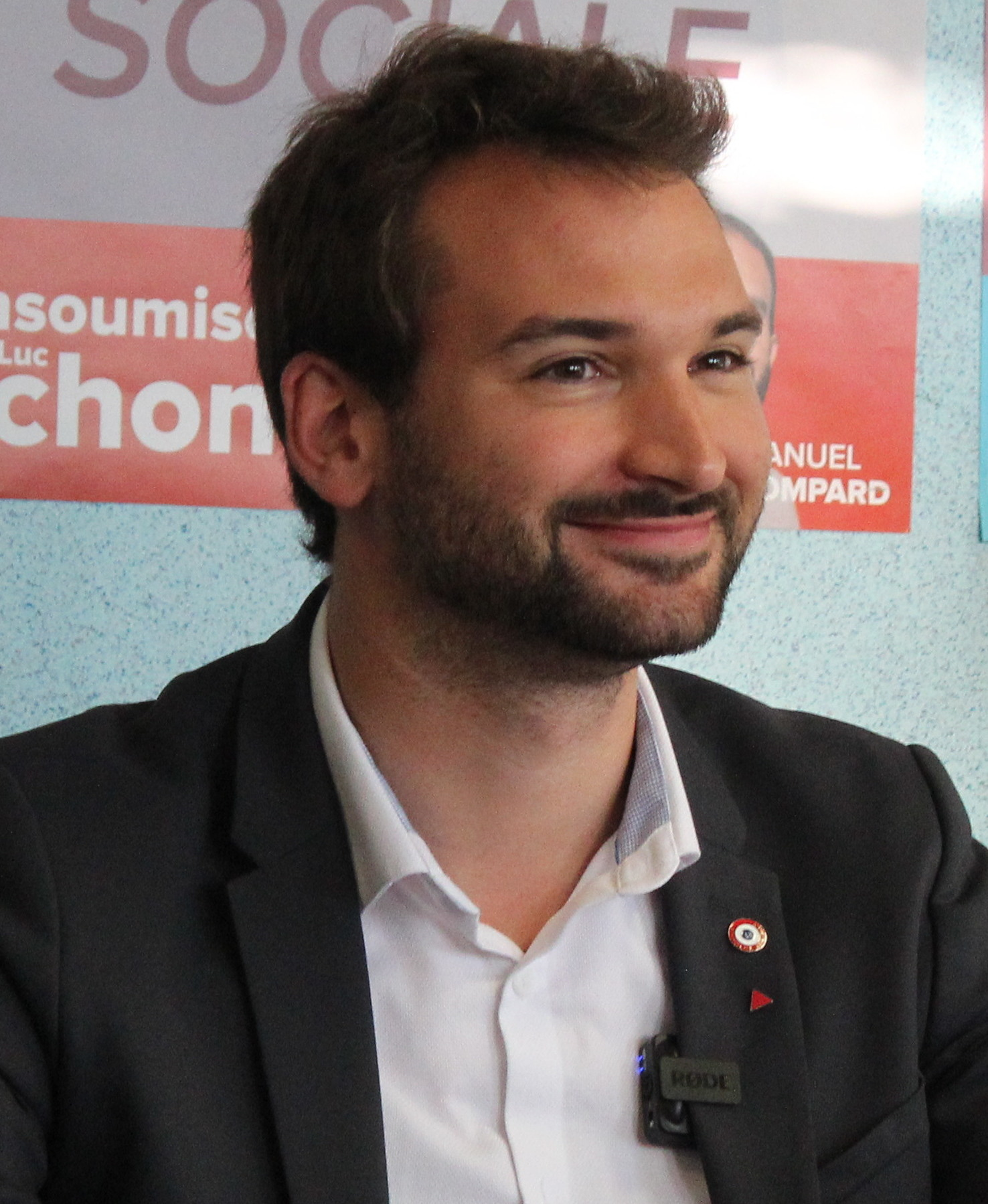
- Ugo Bernalicis in 2019

Member of the National Assembly for Nord's 2nd constituency
- Incumbent
- Assumed office 21 June 2017
- Preceded by: Audrey Linkenheld

Personal details
- Born: Ugo Marco Bernalicis; 25 September 1989 (age 36) Arras, France
- Party: La France Insoumise (2016–present); Left Party (2009–present)
- Other political affiliations: Socialist Party (2007–08)
- Education: Charles de Gaulle University – Lille III
- Profession: Civil servant

Ugo Bernalicis (French pronunciation: [yɡo bɛʁnalisis]; born 25 September 1989) is a French politician and represents the department of Nord, in the French National Assembly.

== Biography ==
=== Early life ===
Ugo Bernalicis was born into a family close to the communist movement, with a militant father, an elected grandfather and a great-grandfather who was deported to the Dachau concentration camp because of his political convictions. He grew up in the countryside near Arras.

Whilst a student at Charles de Gaulle University – Lille III, Ugo Bernalicis joined the Union Nationale des Étudiants de France. He campaigned with the Union of Communist Students and the CGT-CROUS for the improvement of students' living conditions, and organized a rent strike to fight against "unhealthy" student residences in Lille.

In September 2012, he joined the Regional Institute of Administration of Lille.

=== Political career ===
In 2007, Ugo Bernalicis joined the Socialist Party and moved closer to Marie-Noëlle Lienemann and Jean-Luc Mélenchon. He co-led a movement within the Young Socialist Movement called The Socialist Offensive.

In 2008, he left the Socialist Party with Jean-Luc Mélenchon to continue his political commitment in his new organization, the Left Party. In March 2010, he was a candidate for regional elections on the list of the Left Front, with Alain Bocquet as the head of the list. In March 2011, following an agreement with the French Communist Party, he was a candidate of the Left Front for cantonal elections in the canton of Lille-Sud-Est and obtained 9.07% of the votes cast.

He was a candidate in the 2012 legislative elections in the 2nd constituency of Nord, supported by the French Communist Party, the Communist Coordination, the Unitary Left and the Left Party, where he came in fourth place in the first round with 8.87% of votes. He also ran in the 2015 regional elections in Hauts-de-France, in 61st position on the list led by Sandrine Rousseau (Europe Ecology – The Greens, Left Party, New Deal), ranked fifth with 4.83% of the vote.

=== Member of the National Assembly ===
He was elected to the French National Assembly on 18 June 2017, representing the 2nd constituency of Nord. He was second in votes in the first round, narrowly beating incumbent Audrey Linkenheld, but behind Houmria Berrada, the LREM candidate, then easily won the second round.

In the National Assembly, he sits on the Constitutional Acts, Legislation and General Administration Committee. He is a member of Special Commission to Consider the Bill for a State Serving a Trusted Society, member of the Working Group on Digital Democracy and New Forms of Citizen Participation and member of the mission of information on the ethics of the civil servants and the supervision of the conflicts of interest. He is secretary of the Public Policy Evaluation and Oversight Committee. He is a Vice-President of France-Belgium Friendship Group.

== See also ==
- 2017 French legislative election
- Nord's 2nd constituency
