= Hôtel de Ville, Denain =

Town hall in Denain, France

Hôtel de Ville
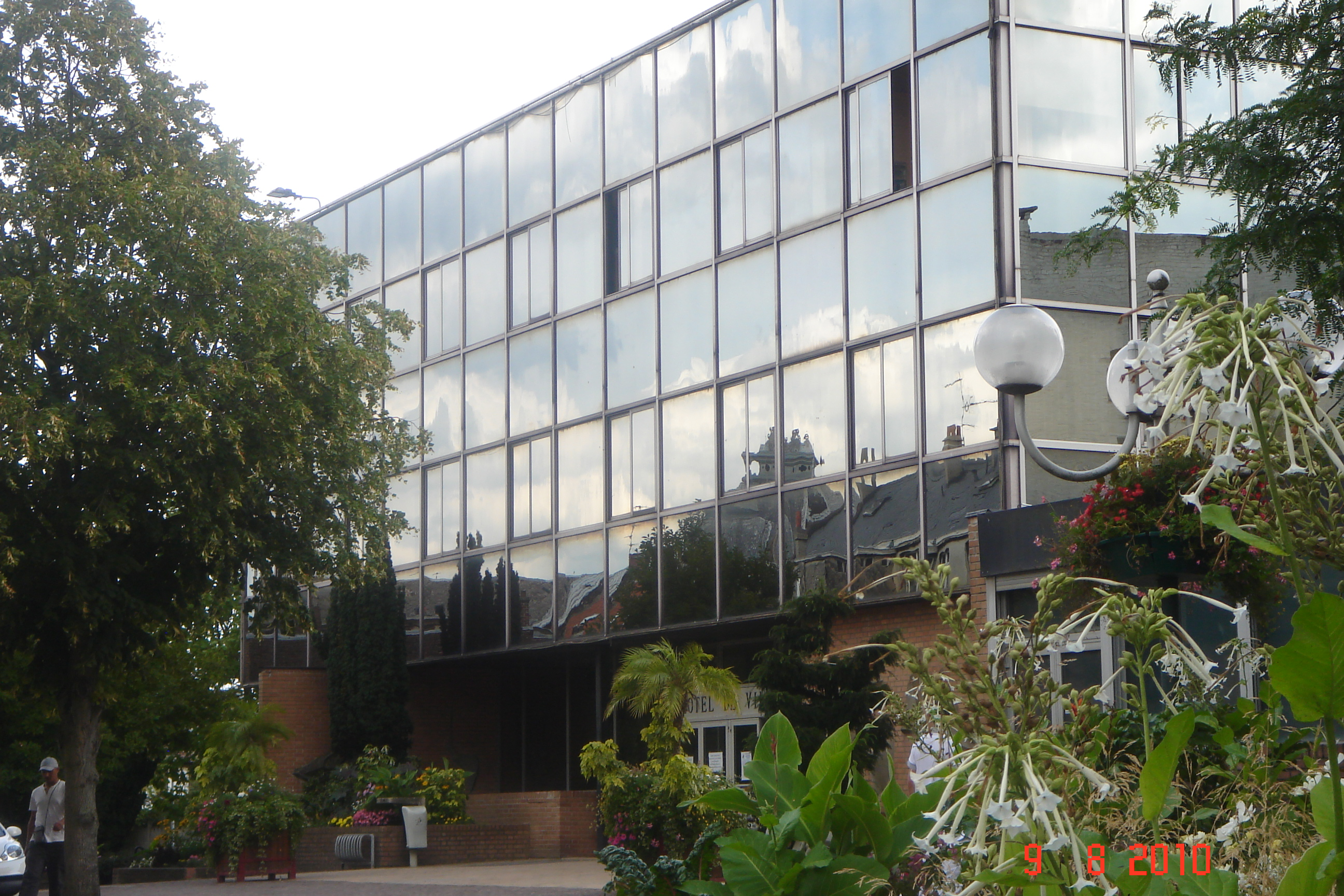
- The main frontage of the Hôtel de Ville in August 2010

General information
- Type: City hall
- Architectural style: Modern style
- Location: Denain, France
- Coordinates: 50.3265°N 3.3946°E
- Completed: 1980

The Hôtel de Ville (French pronunciation: [otɛl də vil], City Hall) is a municipal building in Denain, Nord, in northern France, standing on Rue de Villars.

== History ==
The old town hall

Following the French Revolution, the new town council initially met in the home of the mayor at the time. This arrangement continued until 1847, when the council led by the mayor, Adolphe Deslinsel, decided to commission a purpose-built town hall. The site they selected was an old farm on the west side of the old town square (now Place Wilson), close to the Church of Saint-Martin. The building was designed in the neoclassical style, built in ashlar stone and was completed in 1850.

The design involved a symmetrical main frontage facing onto the old town square. The complex was laid out as a main block of nine bays with a pair of arcaded pavilions in front. One of the pavilions accommodated the fire brigade, while the other accommodated the police station. The central bay of the main block featured a round-headed doorway with a moulded surround and a keystone. There were also round-headed doorways in the second and eighth bays. The remainder of the building was fenestrated by round-headed windows on the ground floor and by square-headed windows on the first floor. The central three bays were flanked by banded pilasters supporting an entablature, a cornice and a parapet and there was originally a square bell tower at roof level.

An imperial staircase, carved from blue stone and adorned with bronze goddesses, was installed in 1891. In 1947, a small museum was established in the town hall. This developed into the Musée d'archéologie et d'histoire locale (Museum of Archaeology and Local History), which still occupies the building.

In the late 1970s, in response to the decline in the local steel industry, the council led by the mayor, Henri Fiévez, decided to establish a modern town square and a modern town hall. The site they selected was on the south side of Rue de Villars. An equestrian statue of Claude Louis Hector de Villars, 1st Duke of Villars by the sculptor, Henri Gauquié, had already been installed in the area in front of the proposed town hall in 1912. It had been destroyed by German Forces in 1918 during the First World War, but recast and re-installed in 1922.

The new town hall was designed in the modern style, built in concrete and glass and was completed in around 1980. The design involved a square-shaped structure facing onto the new square. The ground floor was faced in red brick and contained a glass entrance in the centre and was otherwise blind except for some modern art attached to the wall on the right-hand side. The upper floors were clad in glass. Internally, the principal room was the Salle du Conseil (council chamber). On the night of 29 June 2023, during the Nahel Merzouk riots, the town hall was attacked by a group of individuals who did considerable damage to the building.
