= Jacques Donnay =

French politician (1925–2024)

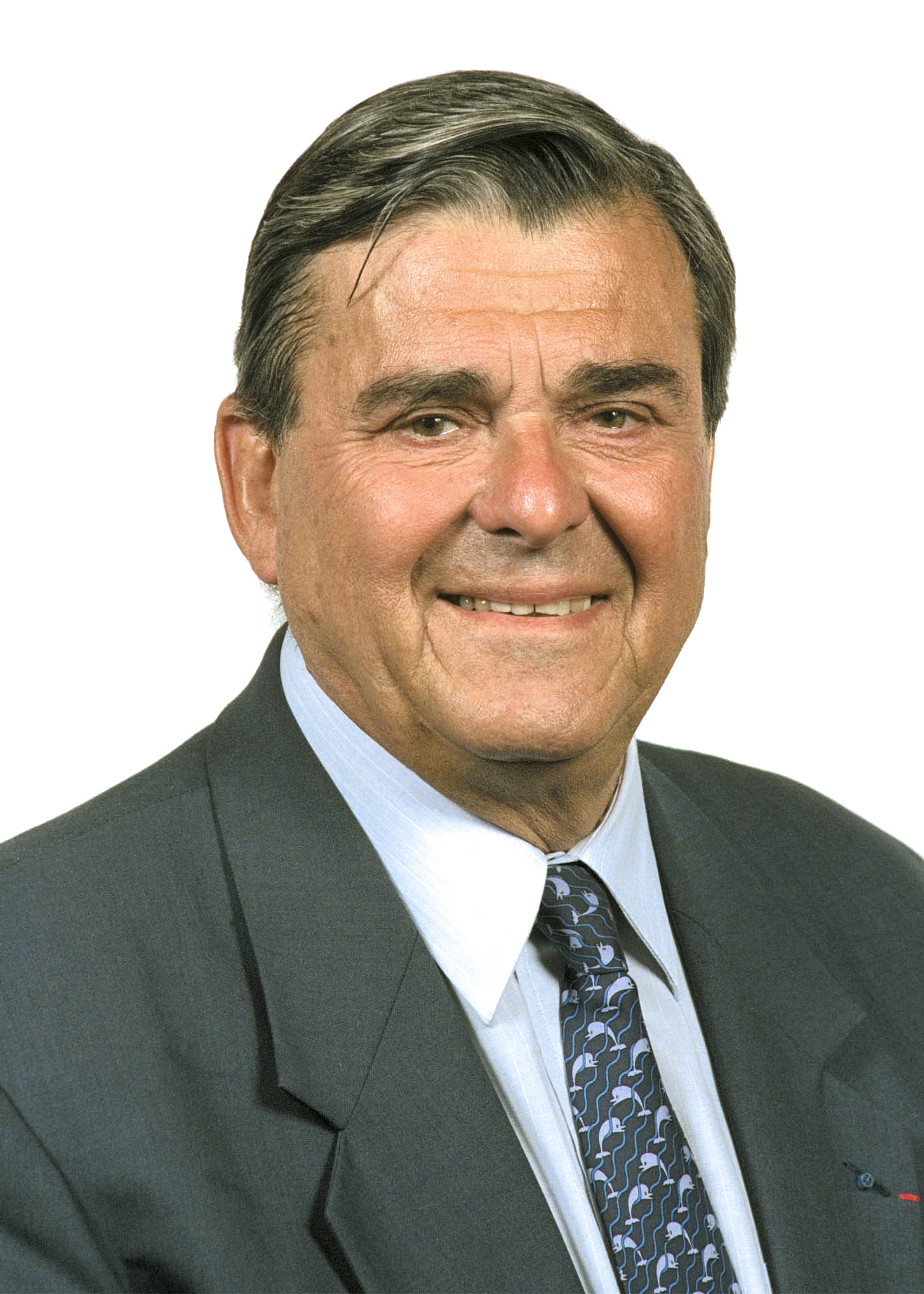
- Official portrait, 1994

Member of the French Senate for Nord
- In office 17 October 1999 – 30 September 2001
- Preceded by: Jean-Paul Bataille

Member of the European Parliament for France
- In office 19 July 1994 – 19 July 1999

President of the General Council of Nord
- In office 29 March 1992 – 22 March 1998
- Preceded by: Bernard Derosier
- Succeeded by: Bernard Derosier

Member of the General Council of Nord
- In office 21 March 1982 – 22 March 1998
- Preceded by: Denise Ségard
- Succeeded by: Christian Decocq
- Constituency: Canton of Lille-Centre

Personal details
- Born: 7 January 1925; Lille, France
- Died: 13 March 2024 (aged 99)
- Political party: RPR

Jacques Donnay (7 January 1925 – 13 March 2024) was a French politician of the Rally for the Republic (RPR).

== Biography ==
Born in Lille on 7 January 1925, Donnay was elected president of the General Council of Nord in 1992. In 1998, he did not seek re-election to his mandate in the Canton of Lille-Centre. He was succeeded at the helm by socialist Bernard Derosier. He also served as a member of the European Parliament from 1994 to 1999. He replaced Jean-Paul Bataille in the Senate after his death in 1999, serving until 2001.

Passionate for tennis, Donnay was president of the Ligue de Flandres for 25 years. In January 2018, the commune of La Madeleine named their racquet center after him.

Jacques Donnay died on 13 March 2024, at the age of 99.
