= Bernard Derosier =

French politician

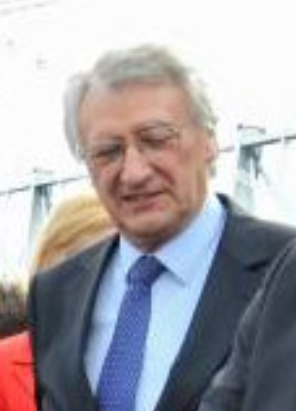
- Bernard Derosier during the laying of the foundation stone of the Grand Stade de Villeneuve d'Ascq.

Member of the National Assembly for Nord's 2nd constituency
- In office 1988–2012
- Preceded by: Self and others (proportional representation by Department)
- Succeeded by: Audrey Linkenheld

Member of the National Assembly for Nord
- In office 1986–1988

Member of the National Assembly for Nord's 4th constituency
- In office 1978–1986
- Preceded by: Arthur Cornette
- Succeeded by: Self and others (proportional representation by Department)

President of the General council of Nord
- In office 1998–2011
- Preceded by: Jacques Donnay
- Succeeded by: Patrick Kanner

Personal details
- Born: 10 November 1939 (age 86) Chevilly, France
- Party: Socialist Party
- Profession: Teacher

Bernard Derosier (born 10 November 1939 in Chevilly, Loiret) is a French politician. He was a long term member of the National Assembly of France, representing the Nord department from 1978 to 2012, as a member of the Socialist Party.

He represented Nord's 4th constituency from 1978 to 1986, then the whole department during the one term of proportional representation (1986-1988), then Nord's 2nd constituency from 1988 to 2012.
