= Nord's 2nd constituency =

Constituency of the National Assembly of France

2nd constituency of Nord
- inline Constituency of the National Assembly of France

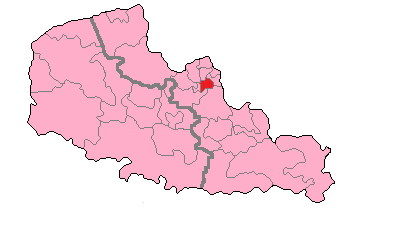
- Nord's 2nd Constituency shown within Nord-Pas-de-Calais
- Deputy: Ugo Bernalicis; LFI
- Department: Nord
- Cantons: Lille-Est, Villeneuve-d'Ascq, Lille-Sud-Est (part)
- Registered voters: 87,326

The 2nd constituency of Nord is a French legislative constituency in the Nord département.

== Description ==
Nord's 2nd constituency covers the eastern portion of Lille including the suburbs of Villeneuve-d'Ascq, Lezennes and Ronchin.

Politically the seat was a bastion of the Socialist Party until 2017 and was for many years held by former President of the Nord General Council Bernard Derosier. It is also notable for being held for many years by Pierre Mauroy, the Prime Minister of France between 1981 and 1984, Mauroy was also the Mayor of Lille for 28 years.

== Historic Representation ==
Election	Member	Party	Notes
1958	Henri Duterne	UNR	
1962	Henri Duterne	UNR	
1967	Pierre Billecocq	UDR	
1968	Pierre Billecocq	UDR	
1973	Pierre Mauroy	PS	
1978	Pierre Mauroy	PS	
1981	Pierre Mauroy	PS	
1981	Pierre Dassonville	PS	Substitute for Pierre Mauroy, appointed Prime Minister
1986	Proportional representation - no election by constituency		
1988	Bernard Derosier	PS	
1993	Bernard Derosier	PS	
1997	Bernard Derosier	PS	
2002	Bernard Derosier	PS	
2007	Bernard Derosier	PS	
2012	Audrey Linkenheld	PS	
2017	Ugo Bernalicis	LFI	
2022	Ugo Bernalicis	LFI	
2024	Ugo Bernalicis	LFI	

== Election results ==
=== 2024 ===
Legislative Election 2024: Nord's 2nd constituency
Party	Candidate	Votes	%	±%
LFI (NFP)	Ugo Bernalicis	26,491	47.31	+3.82
LO	Pascale Rougée	645	1.15	N/A
Volt	Claire Guenon	385	0.69	N/A
NPA	Etienne Testart	208	0.37	N/A
RN	Philippe Guérard	12,256	21.89	−0.57
RE (Ensemble)	Violette Salanon	11,630	20.77	−4.03
LR	Caroline Boisard-Vannier	4,378	7.82	−0.03
Turnout		55,993	97.82	+51.32
Registered electors		87,355		
2nd round result
LFI	Ugo Bernalicis	29,571	53.20	+5.89
RN	Philippe Guérard	13,072	23.52	+1.63
RE	Violette Salanon	12,937	23.28	+2.51
Turnout		55,580	97.64	−0.18
Registered electors		87,386		
LFI hold		Swing		

=== 2022 ===
Legislative Election 2022: Nord's 2nd constituency
Party	Candidate	Votes	%	±%
LFI (NUPÉS)	Ugo Bernalicis	17,212	43.49	-0.75
LREM (Ensemble)	Rudy Elegeest	9,823	24.82	+2.29
RN	Philippe Guerard	5,328	13.46	−0.55
LR (UDC)	Caroline Boisard-Vannier	3,106	7.85	−4.08
REC	Monique Delevallet	1,344	3.40	N/A
PA	Virginie Chauchoy	1,041	2.63	N/A
Others	N/A	1,722		
Turnout		39,576	46.50	−0.20
2nd round result
LFI (NUPÉS)	Ugo Bernalicis	21,740	58.00	-6.15
LREM (Ensemble)	Rudy Elegeest	15,743	42.00	+6.15
Turnout		37,483	45.63	+5.16
LFI hold				

=== 2017 ===
Candidate	Label	First round		Second round	
Candidate	Label	Votes	%	Votes	%
Houmria Berrada	REM	8,935	22.53	10,962	35.85
Ugo Bernalicis	FI	7,598	19.16	19,619	64.15
Audrey Linkenheld	PS	7,314	18.45		
Véronique Descamps	FN	5,554	14.01		
Florence Bariseau	LR	4,731	11.93		
Hélène Hardy	ECO	1,920	4.84		
Romain Leclercq	PCF	711	1.79		
Virginie Chauchoy	DIV	555	1.40		
Mohamed Bousnane	ECO	514	1.30		
Sébastien de Gouy	ECO	378	0.95		
Pascale Rougée	EXG	354	0.89		
Elies Ben Helal	DIV	302	0.76		
Pascal-Alexandre Dudenko	DVG	277	0.70		
Madjid Messabihi	DIV	268	0.68		
Tania Gandrot	DVG	213	0.54		
Arnaud Beils	DIV	28	0.07		
Votes		39,652	100.00	30,581	100.00
Valid votes		39,652	97.98	30,581	87.18
Blank votes		553	1.37	3,046	8.68
Null votes		263	0.65	1,449	4.13
Turnout		40,468	46.70	35,076	40.47
Abstentions		46,195	53.30	51,589	59.53
Registered voters		86,663		86,665	
Source: Ministry of the Interior

=== 2012 ===
Legislative Election 2012: Nord's 2nd constituency
Party	Candidate	Votes	%	±%
PS	Audrey Linkenheld	18,385	40.44	+4.15
UMP	Caroline Boisard-Vannier	9,238	20.32	−8.56
FN	Thérèse Lesaffre	6,542	14.39	+9.92
FG	Ugo Bernalicis	4,031	8.87	+5.39
EELV	Eric Quiquet	3,382	7.44	+2.09
DVD	Christian Carnois	1,753	3.86	N/A
Others	N/A	2,131		
Turnout		45,462	52.06	−5.14
2nd round result
PS	Audrey Linkenheld	27,225	64.69	+6.02
UMP	Caroline Boisard-Vannier	14,858	35.31	−6.02
Turnout		42,083	48.19	−7.99
PS hold				

=== 2007 ===
Legislative Election 2007: Nord's 2nd constituency
Party	Candidate	Votes	%	±%
PS	Bernard Derosier	14,965	36.29	+6.47
UMP	Caroline Vannier	11,909	28.88	+2.41
MoDem	Christian Carnois	5,299	12.85	N/A
LV	Jean-Pierre Mispelon	2,205	5.35	+2.37
FN	Frédéric Gossart	1,842	4.47	−6.63
Far left	Lydie Thouvenot	1,529	3.71	N/A
PCF	Roger Maly	1,434	3.48	+1.06
Others	N/A	2,051		
Turnout		41,867	57.20	−4.11
2nd round result
PS	Bernard Derosier	23,180	58.67	+4.10
UMP	Caroline Vannier	16,327	41.33	−4.10
Turnout		41,121	56.18	+0.25
PS hold				

=== 2002 ===
Legislative Election 2002: Nord's 2nd constituency
Party	Candidate	Votes	%	±%
PS	Bernard Derosier	12,792	29.82	−6.44
UMP	Christian Carnois	11,352	26.47	+6.33
PR	Gerard Caudron	7,943	18.52	N/A
FN	Anne Coolzaet	4,761	11.10	−4.36
LV	Marie Agbessi	1,280	2.98	−1.26
DVG	Nabil El Haggar	1,140	2.66	N/A
PCF	Celine Cuvelier	1,038	2.42	−6.27
Others	N/A	2,585		
Turnout		43,493	61.31	−4.22
2nd round result
PS	Bernard Derosier	20,501	54.57	−9.13
UMP	Christian Carnois	17,064	45.43	+9.13
Turnout		39,677	55.93	−11.40
PS hold				

=== 1997 ===
Legislative Election 1997: Nord's 2nd constituency
Party	Candidate	Votes	%	±%
PS	Bernard Derosier	15,497	36.26	
RPR	Dominique Rosselle	8,608	20.14	
FN	Philippe Bernard	6,605	15.46	
PCF	Jean Raymond de Grève	3,715	8.69	
LO	Gilles Boury	1,906	4.46	
LV	Ronald Charbaut	1,814	4.24	
DVD	Jean Victor Lamon	915	2.14	
Others	N/A	3,674		
Turnout		44,471	65.53	
2nd round result
PS	Bernard Derosier	27,268	63.70	
RPR	Dominique Rosselle	15,536	36.30	
Turnout		45,690	67.33	
PS hold				

== Sources ==
- Official results of French elections from 2002: "Résultats électoraux officiels en France" (in French).
