= Audrey Linkenheld =

French politician

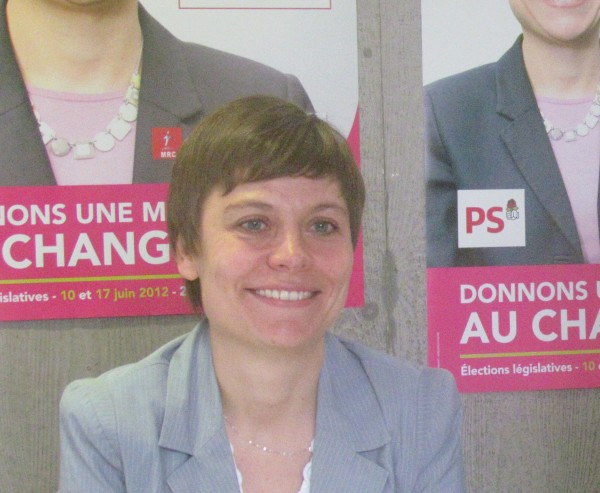
- Audrey Linkenheld in May 2012
- Parliamentary group: Socialist Party

Deputy for Nord's 2nd constituency in the National Assembly of France
- In office 20 June 2012 – 20 June 2017
- Preceded by: Bernard Derosier (PS)
- Succeeded by: Ugo Bernalicis (FI)

Deputy Mayor of Lille
- In office 21 March 2008 – 1 October 2012

Personal details
- Born: 11 October 1973 (age 52) Strasbourg

Audrey Linkenheld, born 11 October 1973 in Strasbourg, is a French politician. She was the deputy for Nord's 2nd constituency from 2012 to 2017.

Linkenheld began her political engagement as the national secretary of the Young Socialist Movement. From 2008, she was deputy mayor of Lille, in charge of housing.

She successfully stood in the 2012 French legislative election for Nord's 2nd constituency against another deputy mayor of Lille, Éric Quiquet.

After the victory of Benoît Hamon in the citizen's primary of 2017, she was named the leader (with Daniel Goldberg) of the "Politics of the city, housing" theme of Hamon's presidential campaign. In her National Assembly re-election attempt in 2017, she was eliminated (by a small margin) in the first round.

She is on the board of Sciences Po Lille.
