= Nord's 4th constituency =

Constituency of the National Assembly of France

4th constituency of the Nord
- inline Constituency of the National Assembly of France

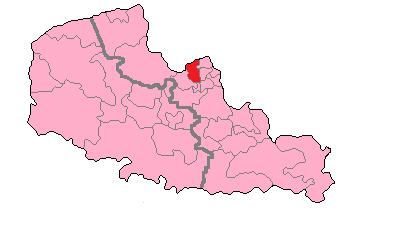
- Nord's 4th Constituency shown within Nord-Pas-de-Calais
- Deputy: Brigitte Liso; RE
- Department: Nord
- Cantons: Lille-Nord, Lille-Ouest and Quesnoy-sur-Deûle.
- Registered voters: 97,181

The 4th constituency of the Nord is a French legislative constituency in the Nord département.

== Description ==
Nord's 4th constituency covers the north and western portions of the city of Lille as well as the town of Quesnoy-sur-Deûle which lies close to the border with Belgium.

Until 2017, the seat was held by parties of the right since 1988 and by Marc-Philippe Daubresse since 1990. As Marc-Philippe Daubresse has been called up to serve in the government on two occasions, firstly under Jean-Pierre Raffarin and then under François Fillon, his chosen substitute Jacques Houssin has also represented the seat during that period.

== Historic Representation ==
Election	Member	Party
1958	Madeleine Martinache	UNR
1962	Arthur Cornette	SFIO
1967	Arthur Cornette	SFIO
1968	Robert Menu	UDR
1973	Arthur Cornette	PS
1978	Bernard Derosier	PS
1981	Bernard Derosier	PS
1986	Proportional representation - no election by constituency	
1988	Bruno Durieux	UDF
1990	Jacques Houssin	NI
1992	Marc-Philippe Daubresse	UDF
1993	Marc-Philippe Daubresse	UDF
1997	Marc-Philippe Daubresse	UDF
2002	Marc-Philippe Daubresse	UMP
2004	Jacques Houssin	UMP
2005	Marc-Philippe Daubresse	UMP
2007	Marc-Philippe Daubresse	UMP
2010	Jacques Houssin	UMP
2010	Marc-Philippe Daubresse	UMP
2012	Marc-Philippe Daubresse	UMP
2017	Brigitte Liso	LREM
2022	Brigitte Liso	RE

== Election results ==
=== 2024 ===
Legislative Election 2024: Nord's 4th constituency
Party	Candidate	Votes	%	±%
DIV	Damien Scali	0	0.00	N/A
Volt	Franck Boyaval	144	0.21	N/A
RE (Ensemble)	Brigitte Liso	21,494	31.32	+1.17
LR	Sébastien Leblanc	6,461	9.41	+3.13
DIV	Nicolas Le Neindre	1,330	1.94	N/A
RN	Anne Morand	17,832	25.98	+12.02
PS (NFP)	Charlotte Brun	20,301	29.58	N/A
REC	Patrick Jardin	533	0.78	N/A
LO	Fatima Abdellaoui	539	0.79	N/A
Turnout		68,634	98.04	+49.47
Registered electors		101,833		
2nd round result
RE	Brigitte Liso	27,461	40.17	+8.85
PS	Charlotte Brun	21,395	31.30	+1.92
RN	Anne Morand	19,502	28.53	+2.55
Turnout		68,358	97.85	−0.19
Registered electors		101,863		
RE hold		Swing		

=== 2022 ===
Legislative Election 2022: Nord's 4th constituency
Party	Candidate	Votes	%	±%
LREM (Ensemble)	Brigitte Liso	14,658	30.15	-8.20
EELV (NUPÉS)	Octave Delepiere	13,440	27.65	+7.81
RN	Patricia Plancke	6,785	13.96	+3.09
DVD	Jacques Houssin	5,894	12.12	N/A
LR (UDC)	Sébastien Leblanc	3,051	6.28	−10.36
REC	Patrick Jardin	1,849	3.80	N/A
PA	Gauthier Boullet	1,126	2.32	N/A
Others	N/A	1,809		
Turnout		48,612	48.57	−1.53
2nd round result
LREM (Ensemble)	Brigitte Liso	25,445	56.05	-2.70
EELV (NUPÉS)	Octave Delepiere	19,954	43.95	N/A
Turnout		45,399	47.46	+5.66
LREM hold				

=== 2017 ===
Candidate	Label	First round		Second round	
Candidate	Label	Votes	%	Votes	%
Brigitte Liso	REM	18,781	38.35	21,814	58.75
Jacques Houssin	LR	8,150	16.64	15,317	41.25
Jean-Pierre Houbron	FI	5,921	12.09		
Julien Franquet	FN	5,324	10.87		
Sébastien Leprêtre	DVD	3,931	8.03		
Stéphane Baly	ECO	3,114	6.36		
Pierre-Yves Pira	PCF	681	1.39		
Olivier Fauchille	DIV	642	1.31		
Philippe Harquet	PS	601	1.23		
Christine Tavernier	DLF	525	1.07		
Tanguy Latron	DVD	351	0.72		
Carole Bailleul	EXG	337	0.69		
Alexandre Roubinowitz	DIV	223	0.46		
Hourya Slimani	DIV	217	0.44		
Gwendoline Allimant	ECO	143	0.29		
Élise Renauld	DIV	31	0.06		
Votes		48,972	100.00	37,131	100.00
Valid votes		48,972	98.44	37,131	89.46
Blank votes		559	1.12	3,112	7.50
Null votes		215	0.43	1,261	3.04
Turnout		49,746	50.10	41,504	41.80
Abstentions		49,557	49.90	57,798	58.20
Registered voters		99,303		99,302	
Source: Ministry of the Interior

=== 2012 ===
Legislative Election 2012: Nord's 4th constituency
Party	Candidate	Votes	%	±%
UMP	Marc-Philippe Daubresse	22,012	41.79	−4.98
PS	Hélène Parra	17,250	32.75	+11.26
FG	Edith Gabrelle	2,542	4.83	+2.00
EELV	Vinciane Faber	2,102	3.99	+0.47
Others	N/A	2,063		
Turnout		52,668	54.20	−5.75
2nd round result
UMP	Marc-Philippe Daubresse	26,623	53.31	−5.41
PS	Hélène Parra	23,316	46.69	+5.41
Turnout		49,939	51.39	−4.55
UMP hold				

=== 2007 ===
Legislative Election 2007: Nord's 4th constituency
Party	Candidate	Votes	%	±%
UMP	Marc-Philippe Daubresse	20,145	46.77	+9.37
PS	Martine Filleul	9,257	21.49	+0.99
MoDem	Olivier Henno	7,790	18.09	N/A
FN	Chantal Dubrulle	1,771	4.11	−2.89
LV	Vinciane Faber	1,517	3.52	−3.08
PCF	Emilie Samoy	1,221	2.83	−3.87
Others	N/A	1,369		
Turnout		43,671	59.95	+28.95
2nd round result
UMP	Marc-Philippe Daubresse	23,115	58.72	+5.52
PS	Martine Filleul	16,248	41.28	N/A
Turnout		40,746	55.94	+26.24
UMP hold				

=== 2005 by-election ===
2005 by-election: Nord's 4th constituency
Party	Candidate	Votes	%	±%
UMP	Marc-Philippe Daubresse	9,940	37.40	−13.34
UDF	Olivier Henno	4,434	20.80	N/A
PS	Martine Filleul	4,380	20.50	−2.95
FN	Philippe Bernard	1,501	7.00	−3.52
PCF	Sylviane Houset	1,426	6.70	+3.59
LV	François Ducroquet	1,403	6.60	+3.90
PRG	Jacques Mutez	208	1.00	N/A
Turnout		21,904	31.00	−30.3
2nd round result
UMP	Marc-Philippe Daubresse	9,940	53.20	N/A
UDF	Olivier Henno	8,732	46.80	N/A
Turnout		20,998	29.70	N/A
UMP hold				

=== 2002 ===
Legislative Election 2002: Nord's 4th constituency
Party	Candidate	Votes	%	±%
UMP	Marc-Philippe Daubresse	21,298	50.74	N/A
PS	Martine Filleul	9,841	23.45	−0.90
FN	Yves Bauw	4,414	10.52	−5.76
PCF	Jean-Paul Fossier	1,304	3.11	−6.05
LV	Christian Flejszerowicz	1,134	2.70	−0.09
Others	N/A	3,980		
Turnout		42,810	61.30	−8.27
UMP gain from UDF				

=== 1997 ===
Legislative Election 1997: Nord's 4th constituency
Party	Candidate	Votes	%	±%
UDF	Marc-Philippe Daubresse	15,544	36.75	
PS	Thérèse Loridan	10,302	24.35	
FN	Gilles Alexandre	6,888	16.28	
PCF	Roger Renard	3,876	9.16	
DVD	Jean-Marc Vandewoestyne	1,242	2.94	
LV	Oscar Loubry	1,179	2.79	
GE	Nicole Knecht	1,094	2.59	
Others	N/A	2,177		
Turnout		44,298	67.52	
2nd round result
UDF	Marc-Philippe Daubresse	23,351	54.03	
PS	Thérèse Loridan	19,864	45.97	
Turnout		45,640	69.57	
UDF hold				

== Sources ==
- Official results of French elections from 1998: "Résultats électoraux officiels en France" (in French).
