= Brigitte Liso =

French politician

Member of the National Assembly for Nord's 4th constituency
- Incumbent
- Assumed office 21 June 2017
- Preceded by: Marc-Philippe Daubresse

Personal details
- Born: 29 July 1959 (age 66) Lille, France
- Party: La République En Marche!

Brigitte Liso (born 29 July 1959) is a French entrepreneur and politician of La République En Marche! (LREM) who has been serving as a member of the French National Assembly since the 2017 elections, representing the department of Nord.

== Early career ==
Liso spent her early career in the private sector as a public and commercial relations manager for major groups such as Pernod Ricard and Hachette Livre, then as a medical sales representative for GlaxoSmithKline. She later founded a patisserie business specializing on éclairs.

== Political career ==
In parliament, Liso served on the Committee on Cultural Affairs and Education from 2017 until 2019 before moving to the Committee on Foreign Affairs. In addition to her committee assignments, she is part of the French-Italian Parliamentary Friendship Group.

In July 2019, Liso voted in favor of the French ratification of the European Union’s Comprehensive Economic and Trade Agreement (CETA) with Canada.

== See also ==
- 2017 French legislative election
