= Grands Moulins de Paris =

French historical monument

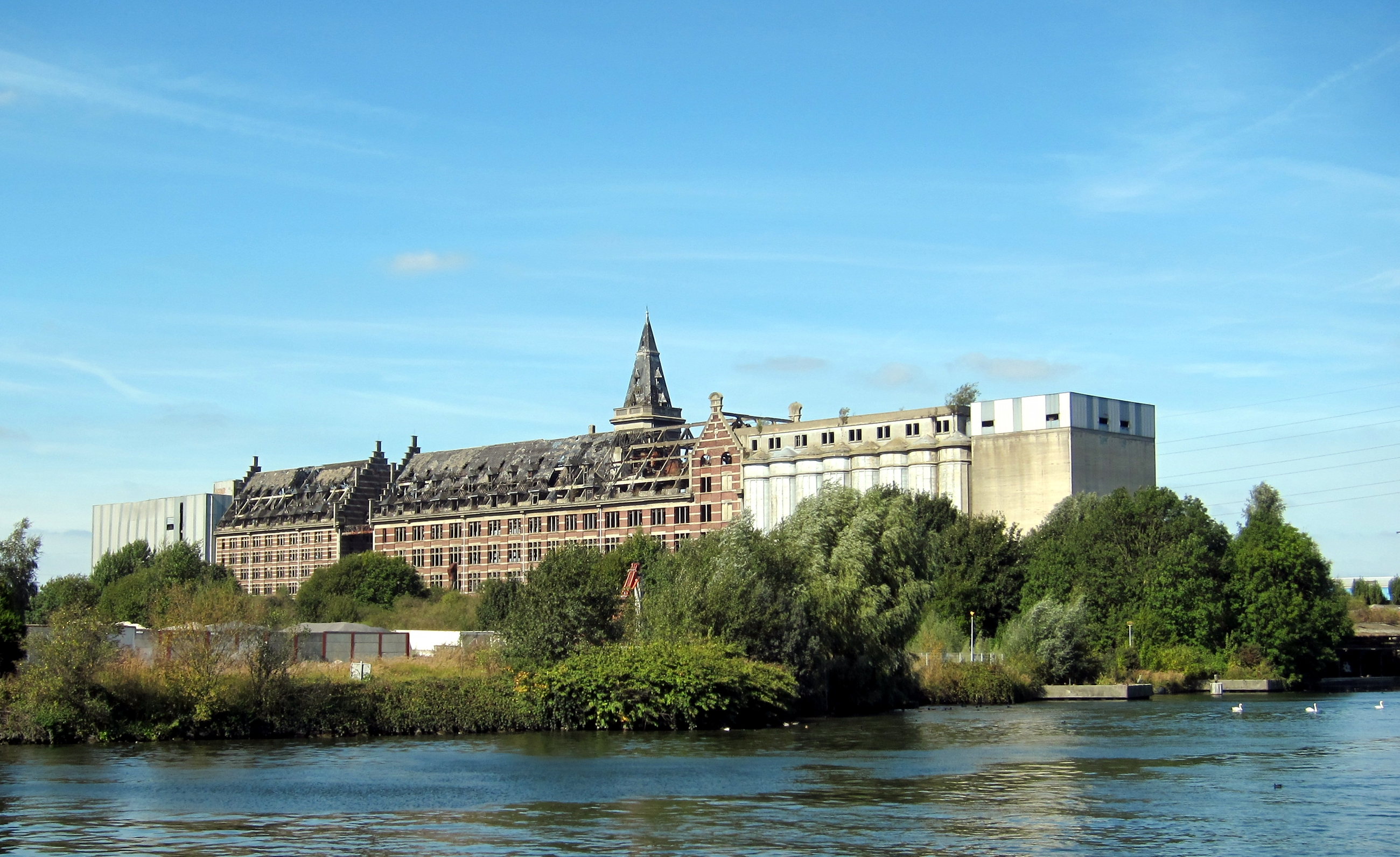

- Location within Hauts-de-France
- 50°40′20″N 3°03′27″E
- Nearest city: Marquette-lez-Lille, Nord, Hauts-de-France

History
- Built: 1921

Site notes
- Architect: Vuagnaux
- Architectural style: Flemish Revival
- Owner: Les Grands Moulins de Paris

Monument historique
- Designated: 30 May 2001
- Reference no.: PA59000071

The Grands Moulins de Paris ("Great Mills of Paris") is a disused flour mill located in Marquette-lez-Lille in the Nord department, France. It has been an official Historical Monument since 2001.

== History ==
The flour mill was established in 1921 near the Deûle River. It was built in a Flemish Revival style by architect Vuagnaux. In 1928, the company Les Grands Moulins de Paris purchased the site and used it until 1989, when it fell into disuse. During the peak activity period, the site had around 400 employees.

The flour mill was listed as an official Historical Monument on 30 May 2001. In the 2010s, it was part of a series of renovations overseen by the European Metropolis of Lille. The facility will be transformed into housing by 2021 or 2022.
