= Marc-Philippe Daubresse =

French politician (born 1953)

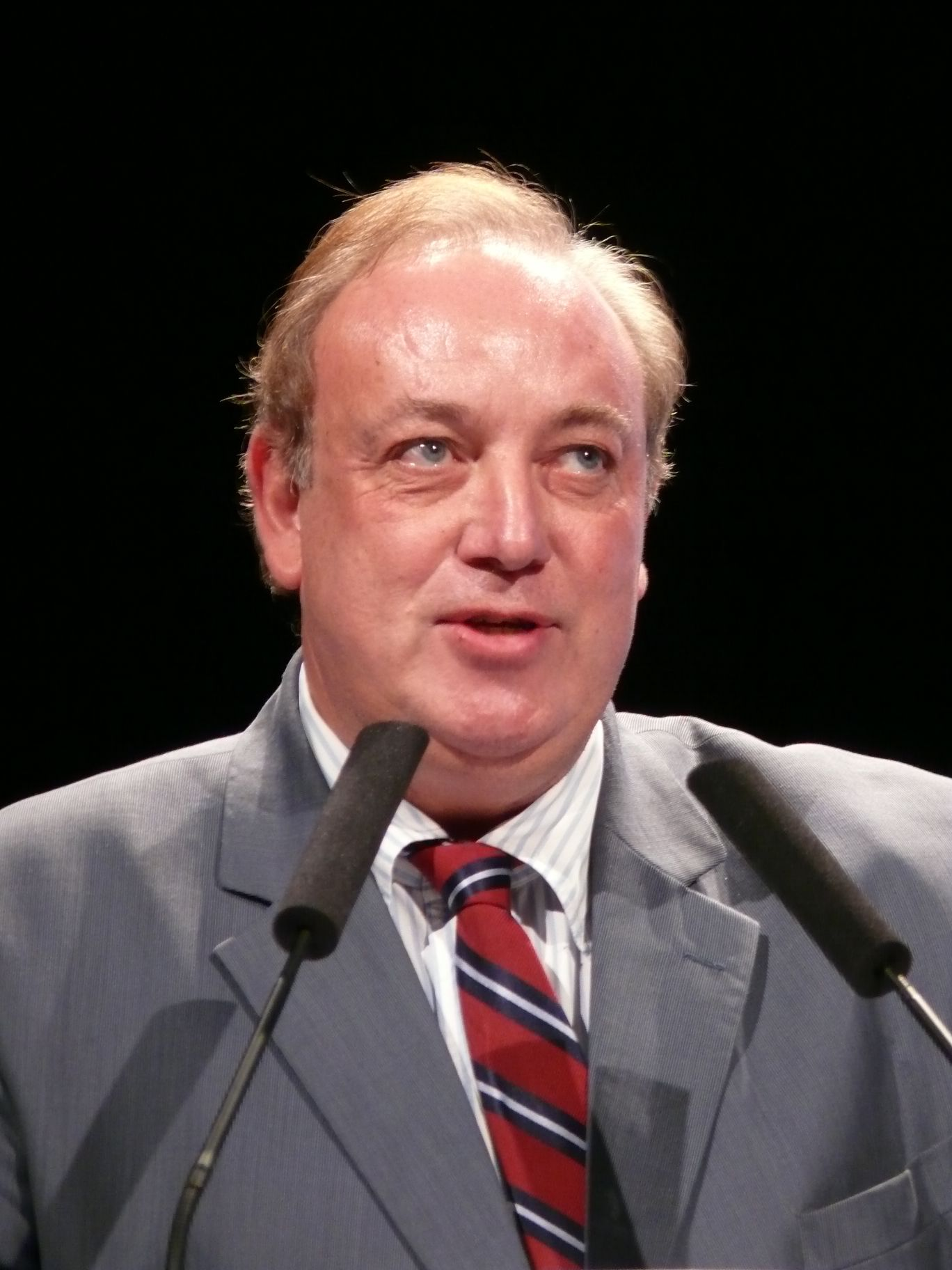

Member of the French Senate for Nord
- Incumbent
- Assumed office 1 October 2017

Member of the National Assembly for Nord's 4th constituency
- In office 2002–2017
- Preceded by: Jacques Houssin
- Succeeded by: Brigitte Liso

Personal details
- Born: 1 August 1953 (age 73) Lille, France
- Party: The Republicans
- Other political affiliations: Union for a Popular Movement (before 2015)
- Education: Lycée Faidherbe
- Alma mater: École centrale de Lille

Marc-Philippe Daubresse (French: [maʁk filip dobʁɛs]; born 1 August 1953) is a French politician.

== Early life and education ==
Daubresse was born on 1 August 1953 in Lille, Nord. He is a graduate of the École centrale de Lille, the Institut Industriel du Nord, and the Institut d'Administration des Entreprises. He was a member of Jeunesse Etudiante Chrétienne.

== Career ==
In 1974, Daubresse worked as staff member for telecommunications Minister Norbert Segard. He also served as regional chair of the Union pour la Démocratie Française, and later the Union pour un Mouvement Populaire for the Nord.

From 1980 to 1983, Daubresse worked for Bouygues.

From 1986 to 1992, Daubresse was a member of the regional council of Nord-Pas-de-Calais. From January 2001 to March 2008, he was the Vice-President of the Urban Community of Lille Métropole. Since 2003, he has been the President of the Conseil National de l’Habitat, then the Agence Nationale de l'Habitat.

From March to November 2004, Daubresse was Secretary for housing, from November 2004 to May 2005, Deputy Minister for housing and cities. and frome March to November 2010 Minister for Youth and Active Solidarities.

Daubresse has been the mayor of Lambersart from 1988 to 2017.

== Political positions ==
In the Republicans’ 2016 presidential primaries, Daubresse endorsed Nicolas Sarkozy as the party's candidate for the office of President of France. In the Republicans' 2025 leadership election, he endorsed Bruno Retailleau to succeed Éric Ciotti as the party's new chair.
