= Eth, Nord =

Eth
- Commune
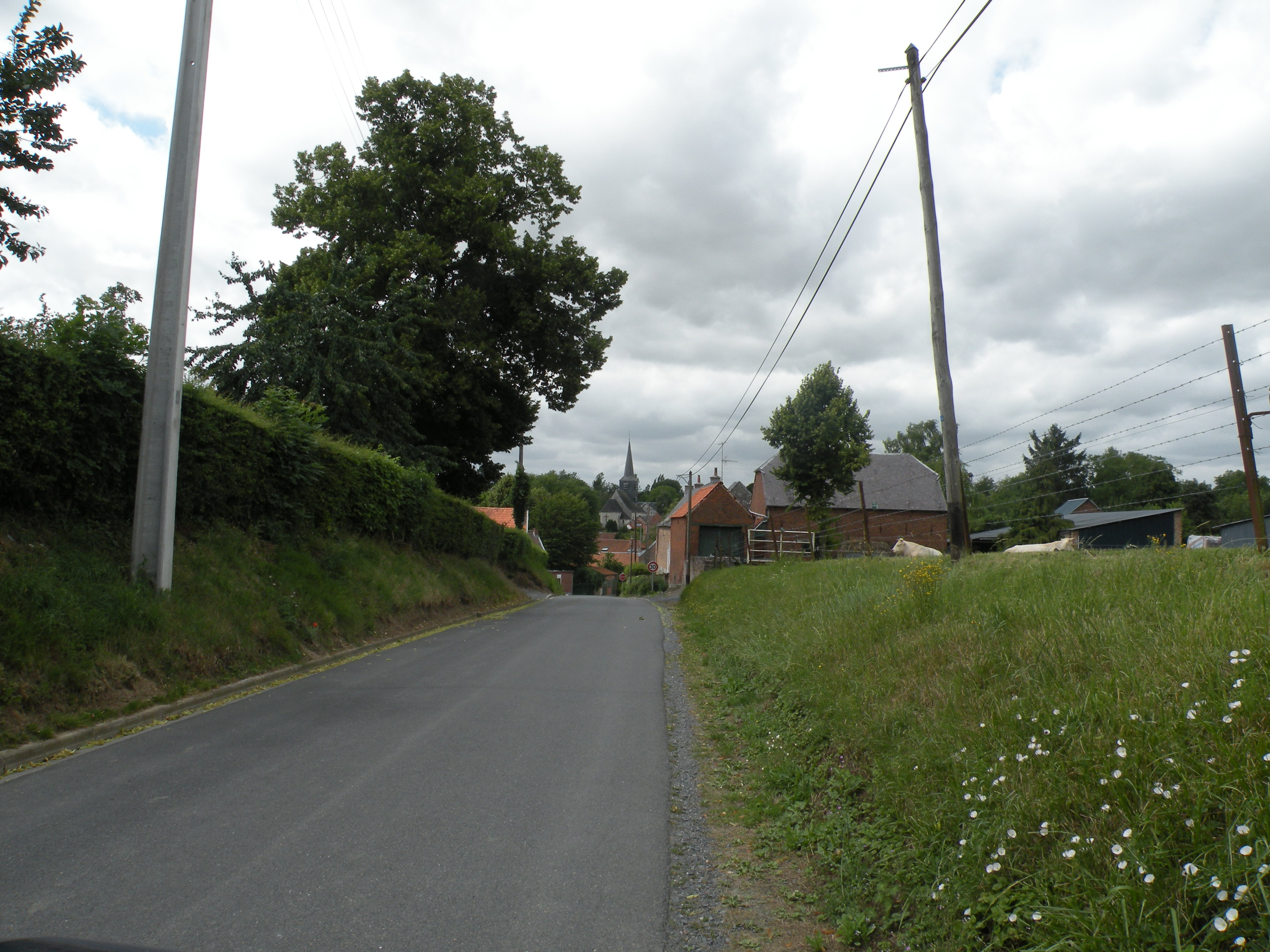
- A view within Eth

- Coat of arms
- Location of Eth
- Location within France Location within Hauts-de-France
- Coordinates: 50°19′36″N 3°40′08″E
- Country: France
- Region: Hauts-de-France
- Department: Nord
- Arrondissement: Avesnes-sur-Helpe
- Canton: Aulnoye-Aymeries
- Intercommunality: CC Pays de Mormal

Government
  - Mayor (2020–2026): Pierrette Guiost
- Area^{1}: 2.84 km^{2} (1.10 sq mi)
- Elevation: 87 m (285 ft)
- Highest elevation: 107 m (351 ft)
- Lowest elevation: 59 m (194 ft)
- Population (2023): 328
  - Density: 115/km^{2} (299/sq mi)
- Time zone: UTC+01:00 (CET)
  - Summer (DST): UTC+02:00 (CEST)
- INSEE/Postal code: 59217 /59144
- ^{1} French Land Register data, which excludes lakes, ponds, glaciers > 1 km^{2} (0.386 sq mi or 247 acres) and river estuaries.

Eth (French pronunciation: [ɛt]) is a commune in the Nord department in northern France.

It is about 10 km (6.2 mi) east-southeast of Valenciennes. Residents are called Ethois (feminine plural Ethoises).

== Heraldry ==
Arms of Eth	The arms of Eth are blazoned : Or, a cross engrailed gules. (Artres, Bettrechies, Cerfontaine, Eth, Lesquin, Obies, Quérénaing, Semousies, Wambrechies and Warlaing use the same arms.)

== See also ==
- Communes of the Nord department
