= Bettrechies =

- Commune
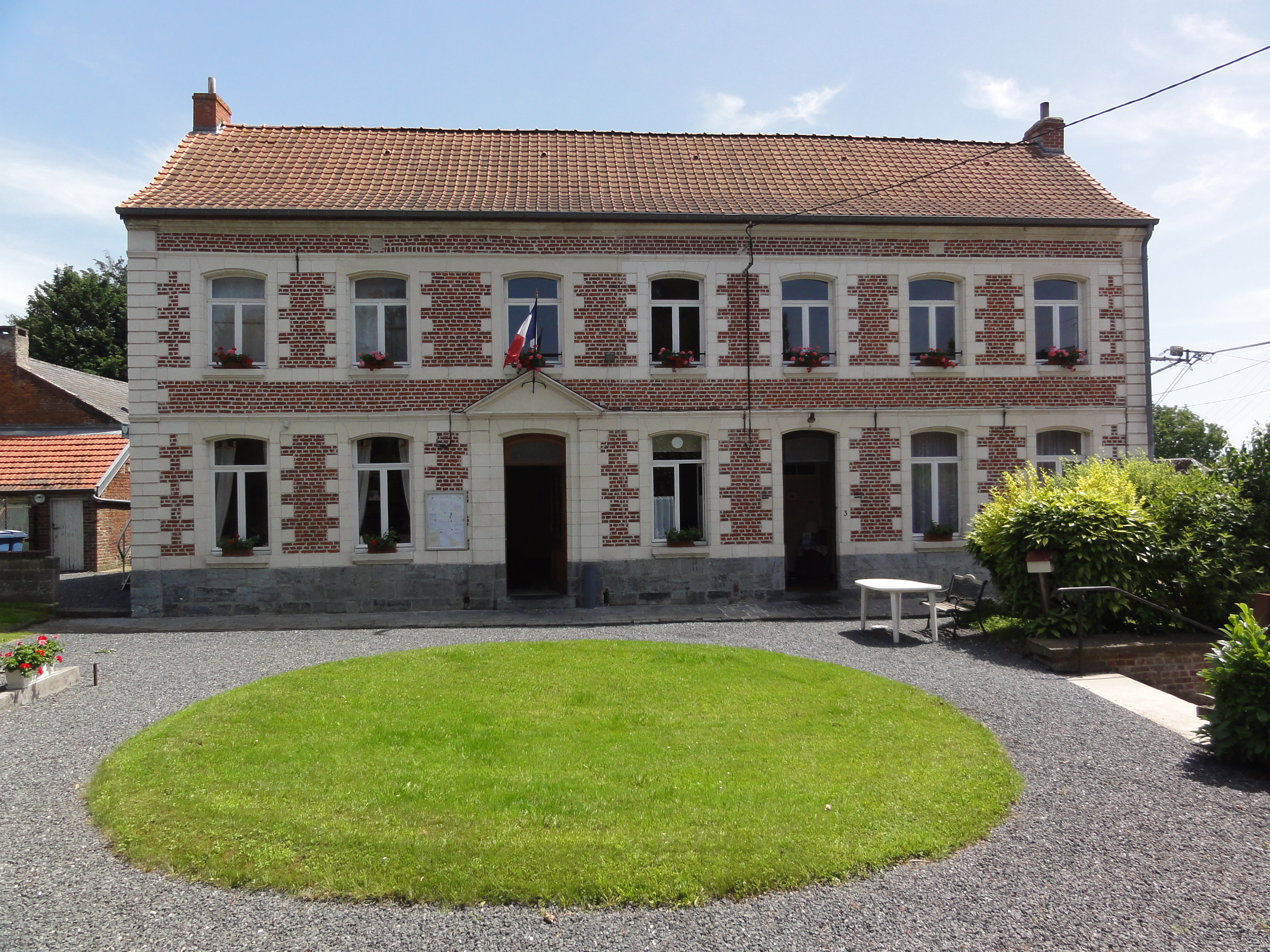
- The town hall in Bettrechies

- Coat of arms
- Location of Bettrechies
- Location within France Location within Hauts-de-France
- Coordinates: 50°19′31″N 3°44′41″E
- Country: France
- Region: Hauts-de-France
- Department: Nord
- Arrondissement: Avesnes-sur-Helpe
- Canton: Aulnoye-Aymeries
- Intercommunality: CC Pays de Mormal

Government
  - Mayor (2020–2026): Philippe Sarraute
- Area^{1}: 3.36 km^{2} (1.30 sq mi)
- Elevation: 100 m (330 ft)
- Highest elevation: 129 m (423 ft)
- Lowest elevation: 67 m (220 ft)
- Population (2023): 253
  - Density: 75.3/km^{2} (195/sq mi)
- Time zone: UTC+01:00 (CET)
  - Summer (DST): UTC+02:00 (CEST)
- INSEE/Postal code: 59077 /59570
- ^{1} French Land Register data, which excludes lakes, ponds, glaciers > 1 km^{2} (0.386 sq mi or 247 acres) and river estuaries.

Bettrechies (French pronunciation: [bɛtʁəʃi]) is a commune in the Nord department in northern France.

== Population ==
Historical population
Year	Pop.	±% p.a.
1968	270	—
1975	253	−0.92%
1982	286	+1.77%
1990	235	−2.43%
1999	246	+0.51%
2007	241	−0.26%
2012	251	+0.82%
2017	252	+0.08%
2023	253	+0.07%
Source: INSEE

== Heraldry ==
Arms of Bettrechies	The arms of Bettrechies are blazoned : Or, a cross engrailed gules. (Artres, Bettrechies, Cerfontaine, Eth, Lesquin, Obies, Quérénaing, Semousies, Wambrechies and Warlaing use the same arms.)

== See also ==
- Communes of the Nord department
