= Obies =

- Commune
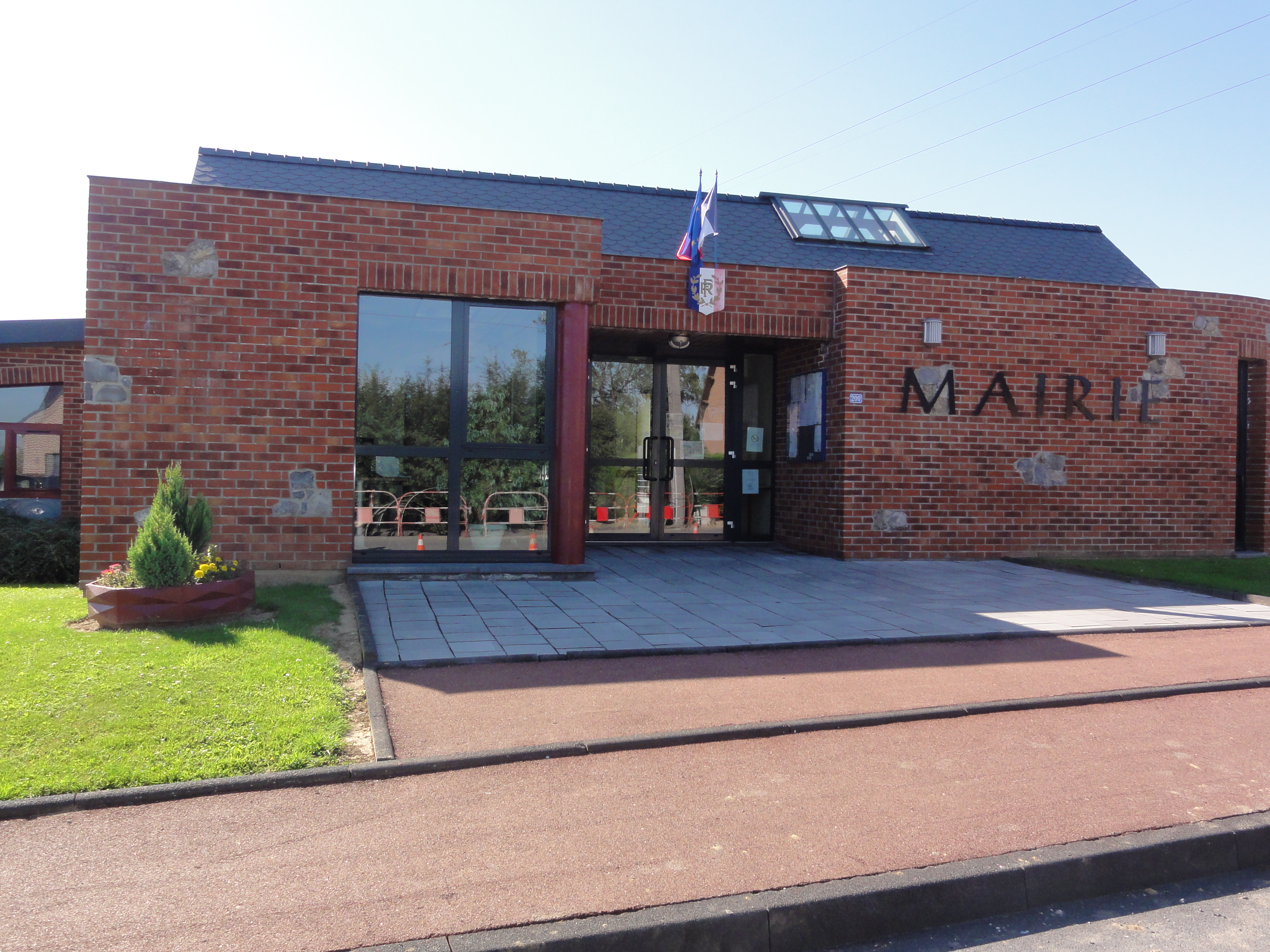
- The town hall in Obies

- Coat of arms
- Location of Obies
- Location within France Location within Hauts-de-France
- Coordinates: 50°16′03″N 3°47′15″E
- Country: France
- Region: Hauts-de-France
- Department: Nord
- Arrondissement: Avesnes-sur-Helpe
- Canton: Aulnoye-Aymeries
- Intercommunality: Pays de Mormal

Government
  - Mayor (2020–2026): Jean-Louis Baudez
- Area^{1}: 5.43 km^{2} (2.10 sq mi)
- Elevation: 136 m (446 ft)
- Highest elevation: 159 m (522 ft)
- Lowest elevation: 117 m (384 ft)
- Population (2023): 660
  - Density: 120/km^{2} (310/sq mi)
- Time zone: UTC+01:00 (CET)
  - Summer (DST): UTC+02:00 (CEST)
- INSEE/Postal code: 59441 /59570
- ^{1} French Land Register data, which excludes lakes, ponds, glaciers > 1 km^{2} (0.386 sq mi or 247 acres) and river estuaries.

Obies (French pronunciation: [ɔbi]) is a commune in the Nord department in northern France.

== Heraldry ==
| Arms of Obies | The arms of Obies are blazoned: Or, a cross engrailed gules. (Artres, Bettrechies, Cerfontaine, Eth, Lesquin, Obies, Quérénaing, Semousies, Wambrechies and Warlaing use the same arms.) |

== See also ==
- Communes of the Nord department
