= Warlaing =

- Commune
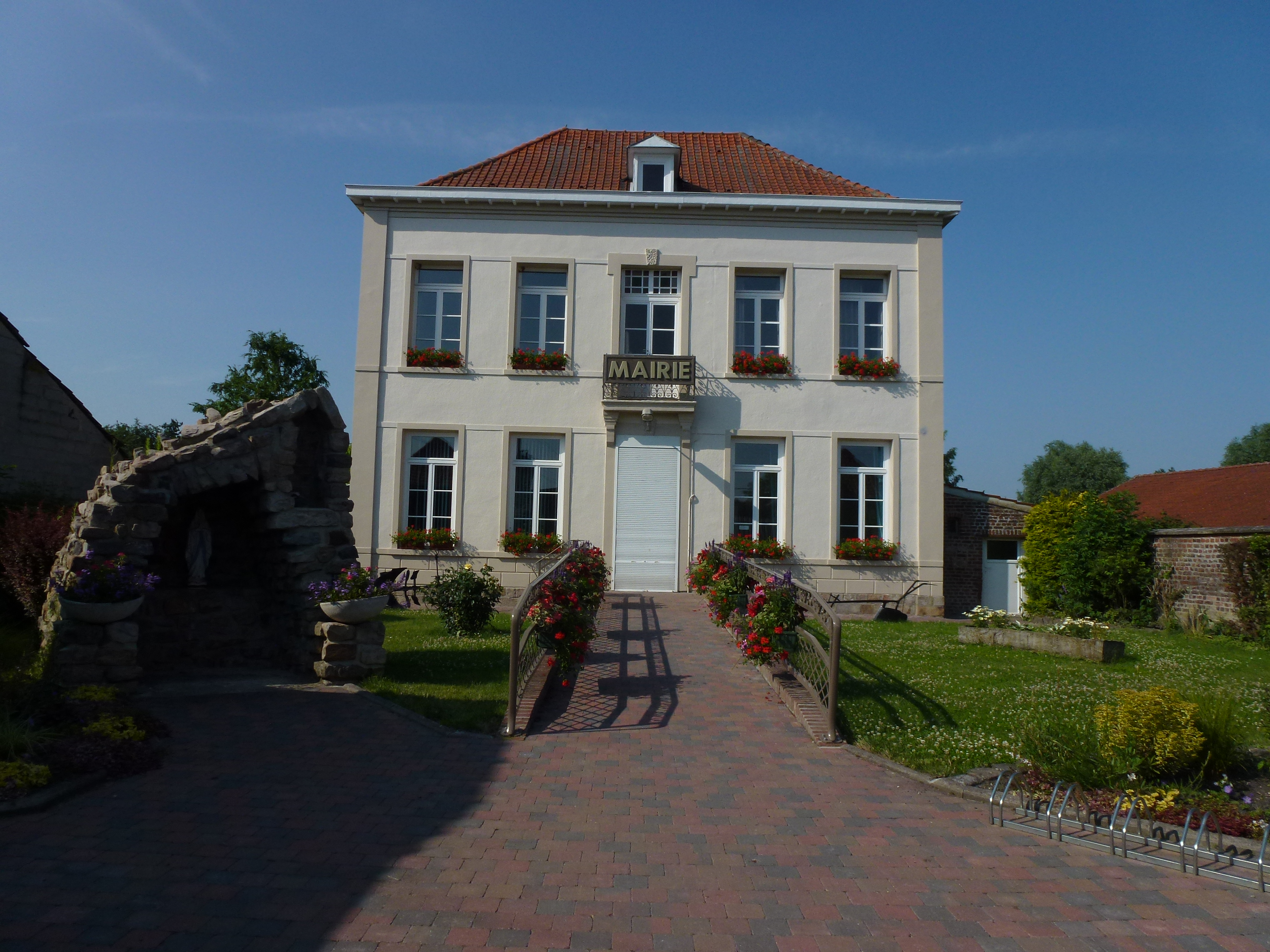
- The town hall

- Coat of arms
- Location of Warlaing
- Location within France Location within Hauts-de-France
- Coordinates: 50°24′40″N 3°19′34″E
- Country: France
- Region: Hauts-de-France
- Department: Nord
- Arrondissement: Douai
- Canton: Sin-le-Noble
- Intercommunality: Cœur d'Ostrevent

Government
  - Mayor (2020–2026): Patrice Bricout
- Area^{1}: 3.89 km^{2} (1.50 sq mi)
- Elevation: 17 m (56 ft)
- Highest elevation: 19 m (62 ft)
- Lowest elevation: 16 m (52 ft)
- Population (2023): 603
  - Density: 155/km^{2} (401/sq mi)
- Time zone: UTC+01:00 (CET)
  - Summer (DST): UTC+02:00 (CEST)
- INSEE/Postal code: 59642 /59870
- ^{1} French Land Register data, which excludes lakes, ponds, glaciers > 1 km^{2} (0.386 sq mi or 247 acres) and river estuaries.

Warlaing (French pronunciation: [waʁlɛ̃]) is a commune in the Nord department in northern France.

== Heraldry ==
Arms of Warlaing	The arms of Warlaing are blazoned : Or, a cross engrailed gules. (Artres, Bettrechies, Cerfontaine, Eth, Lesquin, Obies, Quérénaing, Semousies, Wambrechies and Warlaing use the same arms.)

== Population ==
Historical population
Year	Pop.	±% p.a.
1968	359	—
1975	352	−0.28%
1982	340	−0.49%
1990	381	+1.43%
1999	461	+2.14%
2007	562	+2.51%
2012	542	−0.72%
2017	579	+1.33%
2023	603	+0.68%
Source: INSEE

== Sites and monuments ==
- Church of our Lady of the Assumption, built around 1852 by Lille architect Charles Leroy, who was the designer of many religious buildings in northern France, including the Notre-Dame de la Treille cathedral.
- The Château de Warlaing, now in ruins, was destroyed by the armies of Louis XIV.
- The Scarpe, its lock and bridge.
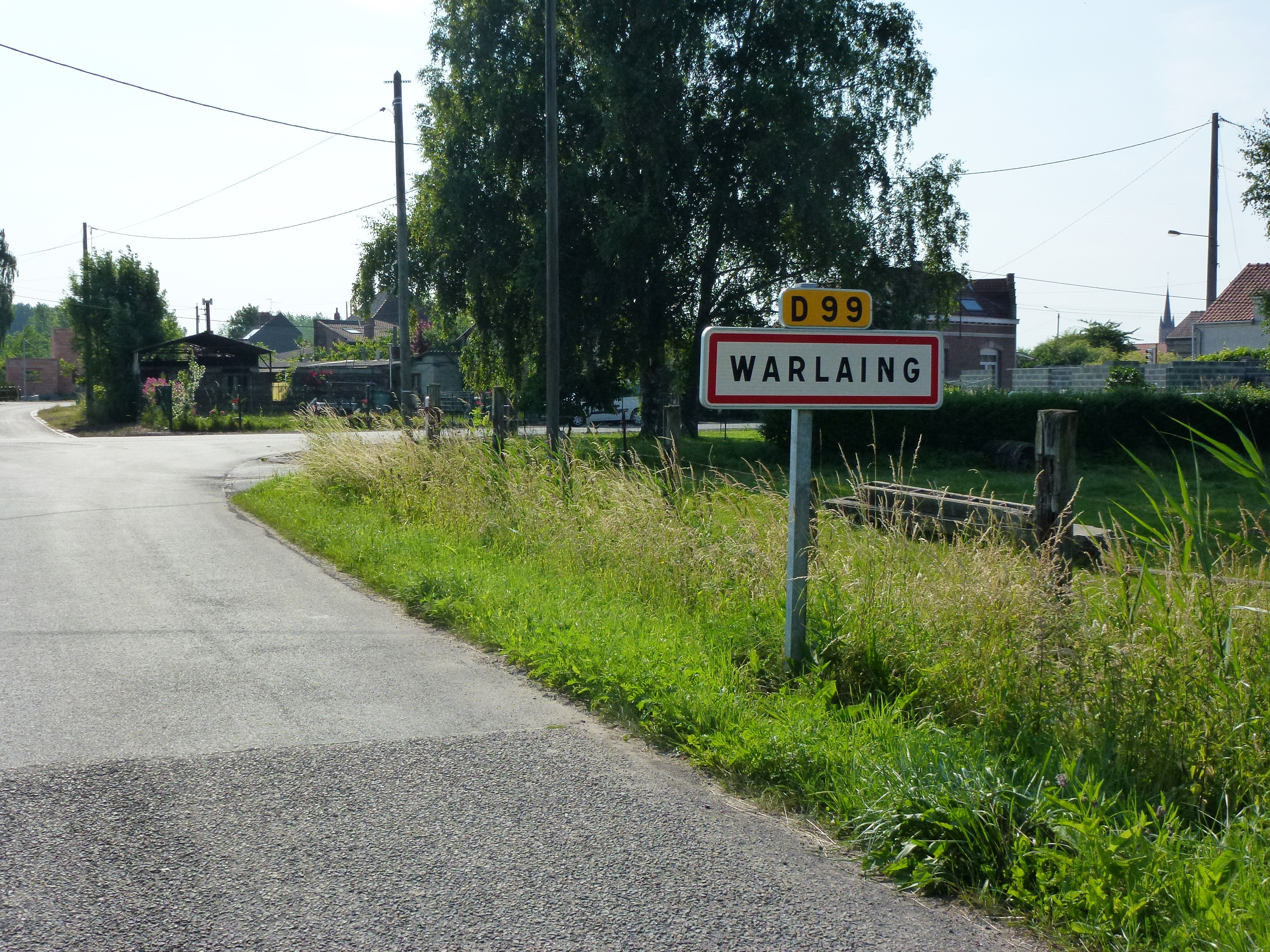
The road into Warlaing

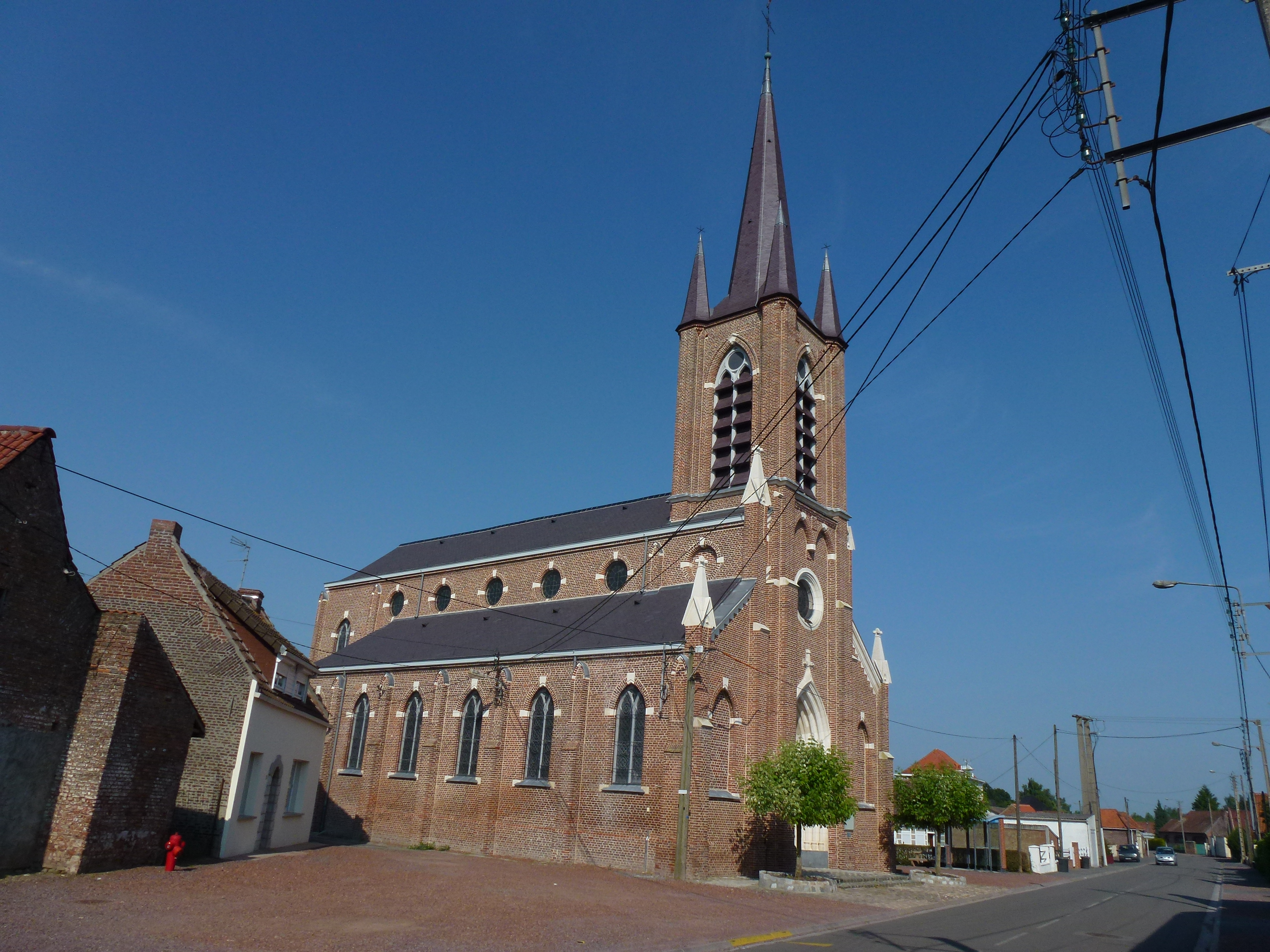
The Church of Our Lady of the Assumption

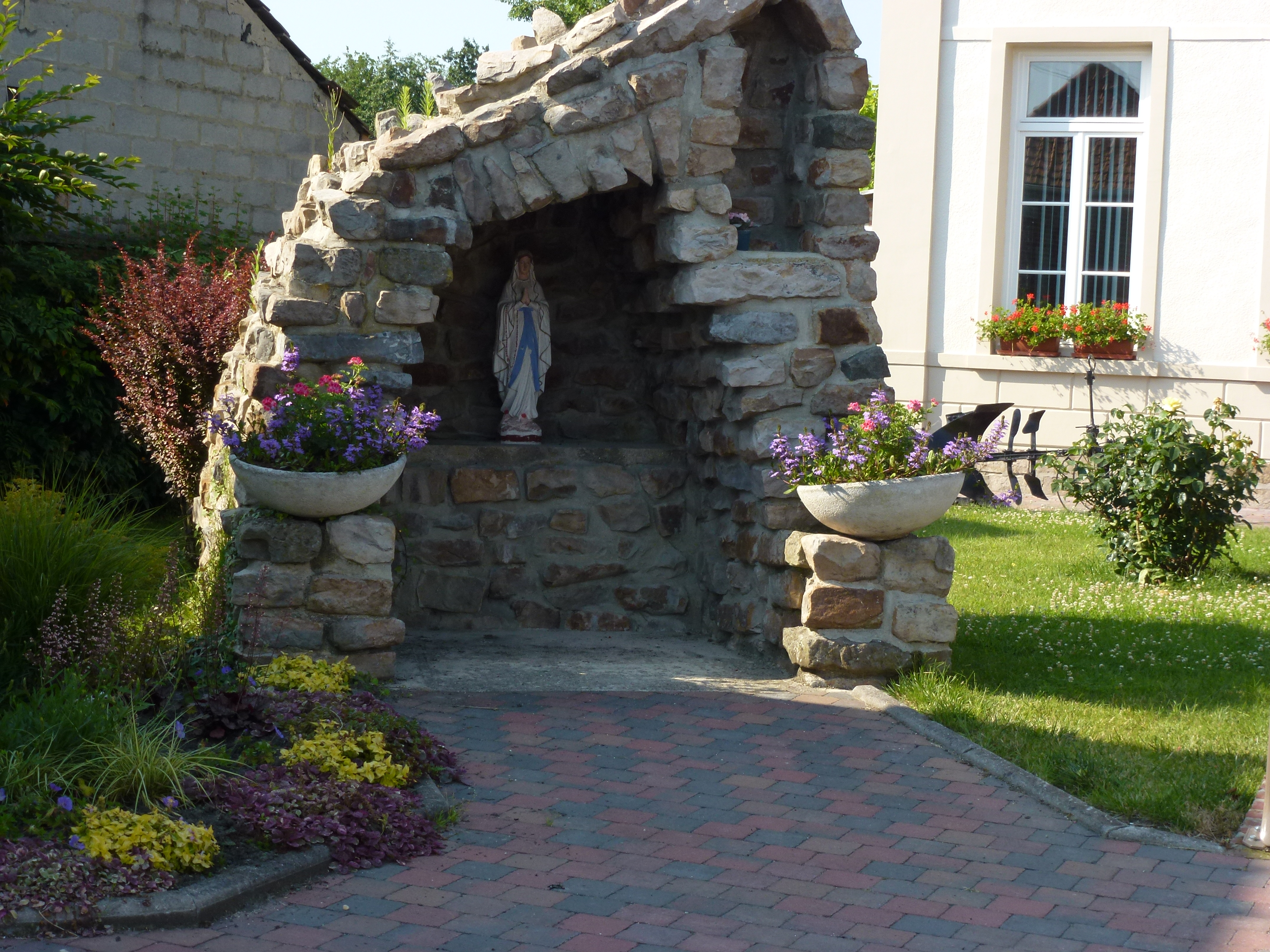
The grotto of Lourdes

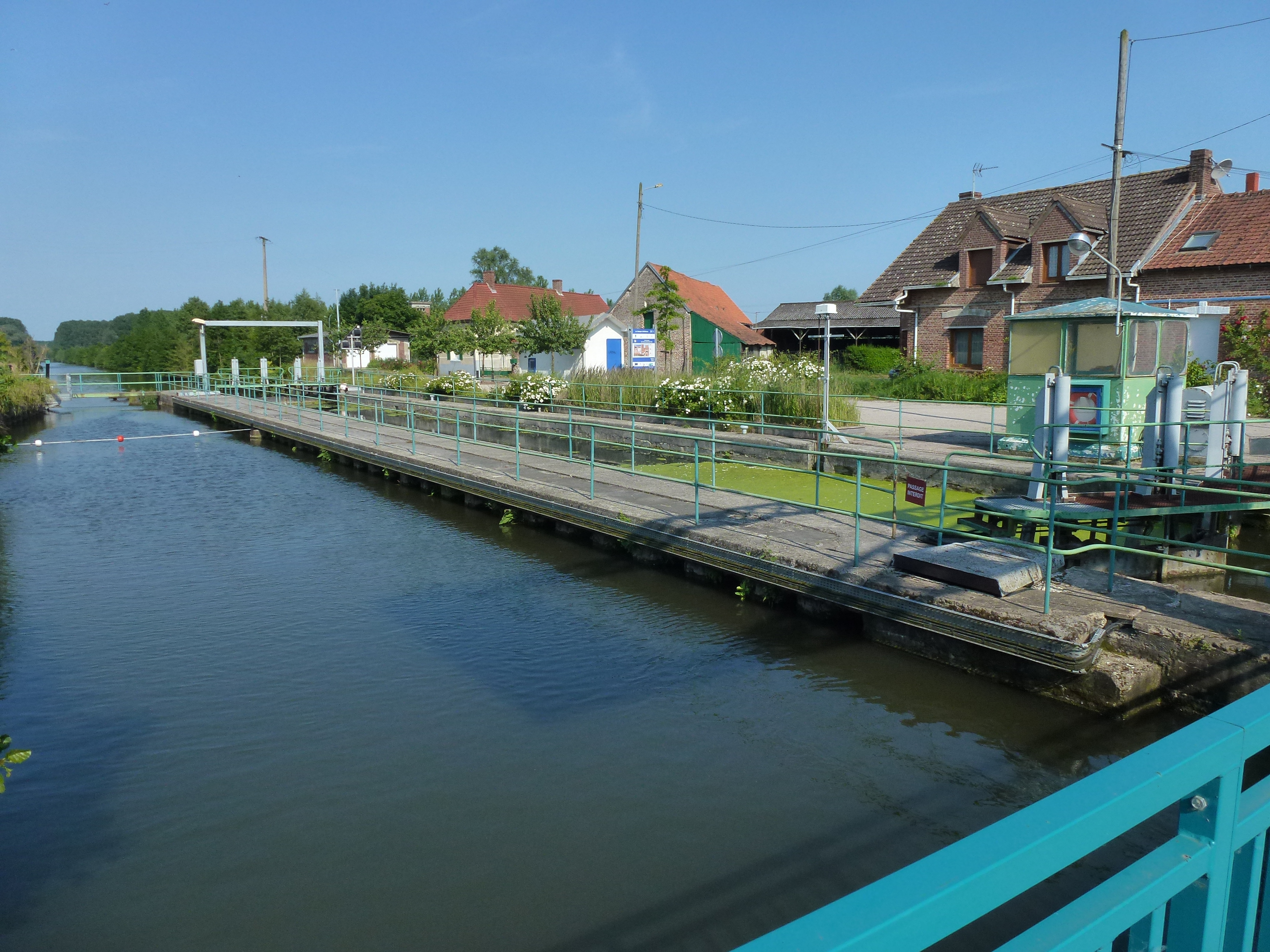
The lock of the Scarpe

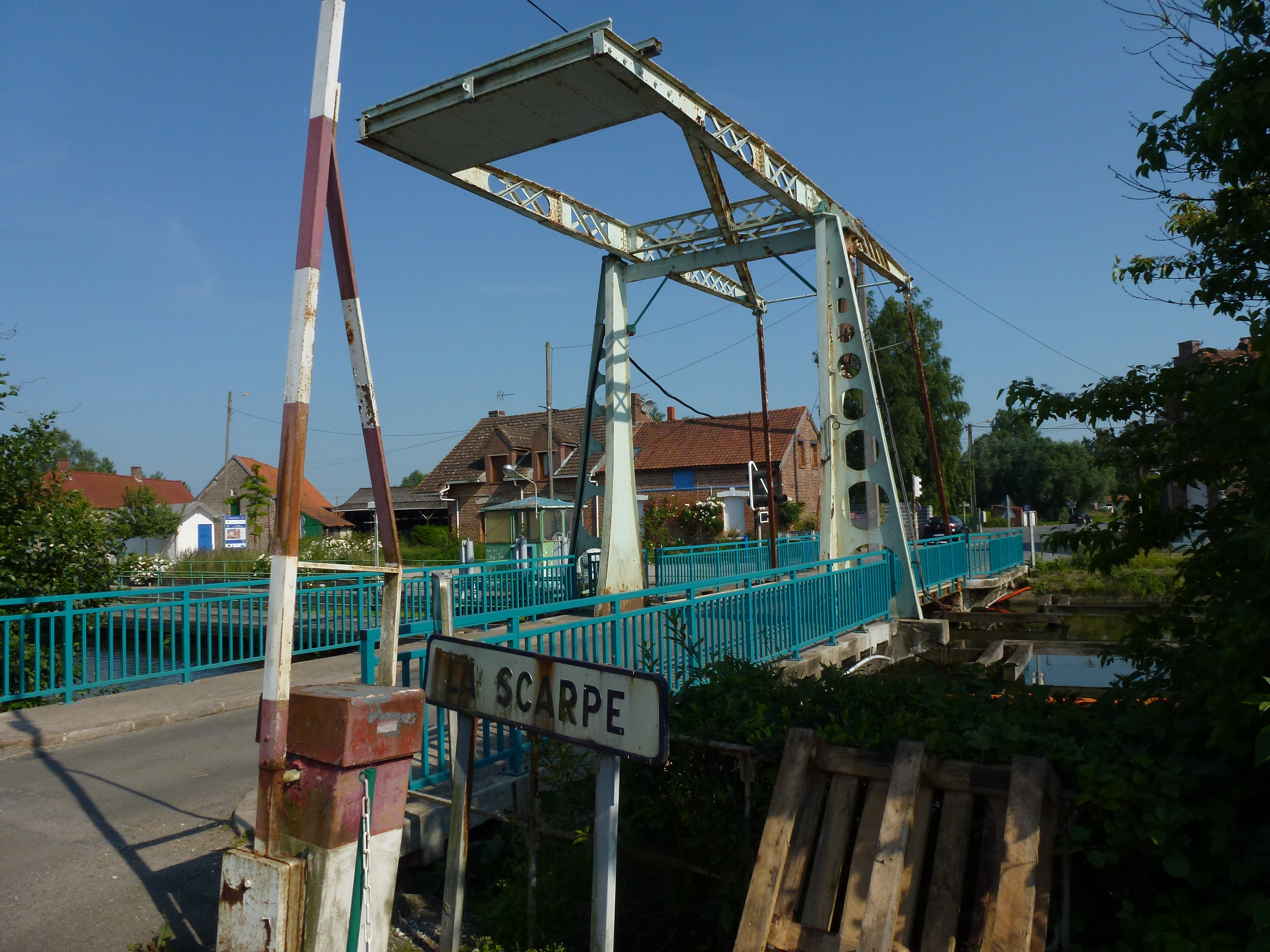
The bascule bridge on the Scarpe

== See also ==
- Communes of the Nord department
