= Quérénaing =

- Commune
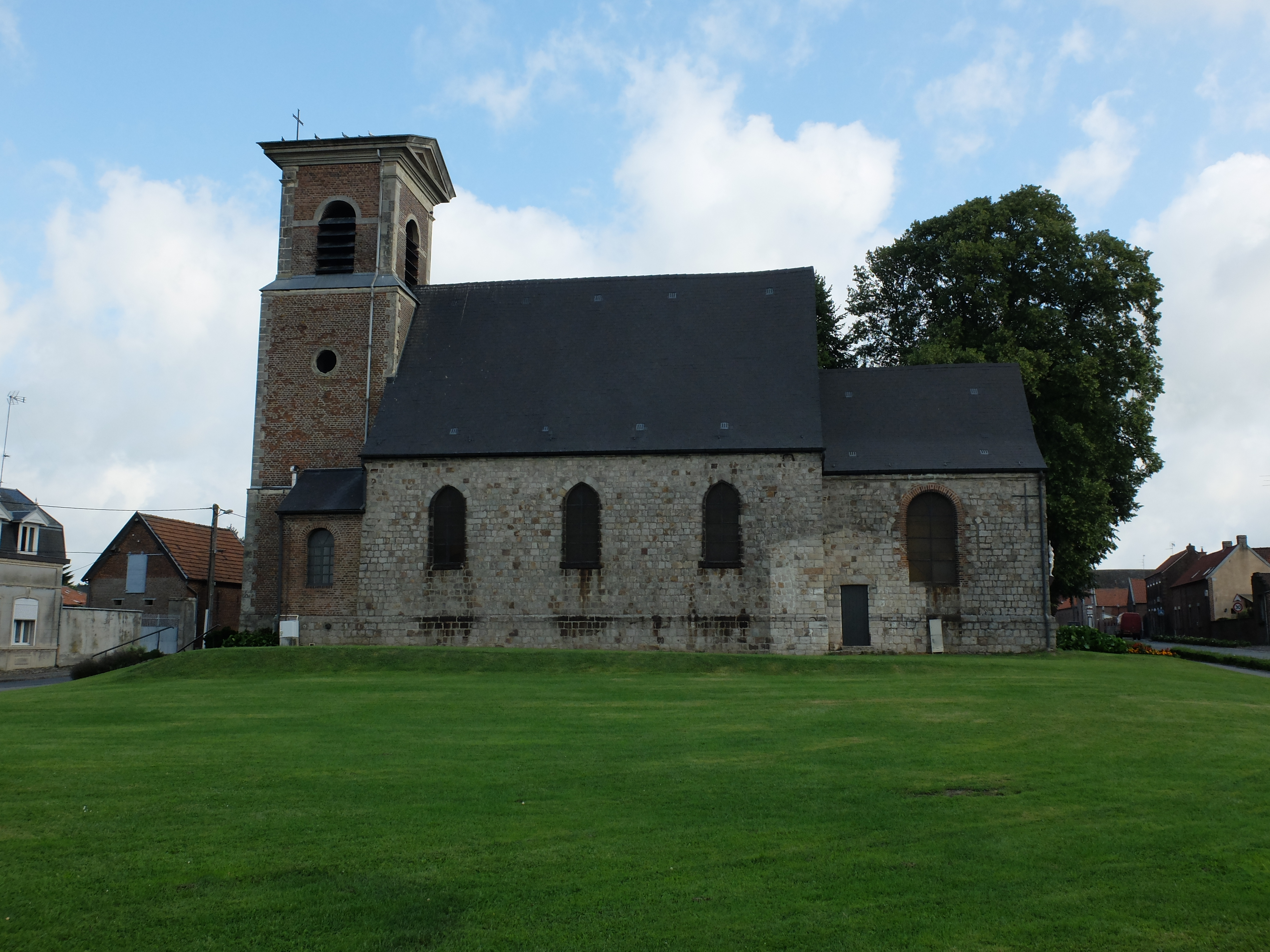
- The church in Quérénaing

- Coat of arms
- Location of Quérénaing
- Location within France Location within Hauts-de-France
- Coordinates: 50°17′16″N 3°30′52″E
- Country: France
- Region: Hauts-de-France
- Department: Nord
- Arrondissement: Valenciennes
- Canton: Aulnoy-lez-Valenciennes
- Intercommunality: CA Valenciennes Métropole

Government
  - Mayor (2020–2026): Didier Joveniaux
- Area^{1}: 4.32 km^{2} (1.67 sq mi)
- Elevation: 87 m (285 ft)
- Highest elevation: 102 m (335 ft)
- Lowest elevation: 71 m (233 ft)
- Population (2023): 865
  - Density: 200/km^{2} (519/sq mi)
- Time zone: UTC+01:00 (CET)
  - Summer (DST): UTC+02:00 (CEST)
- INSEE/Postal code: 59480 /59269
- ^{1} French Land Register data, which excludes lakes, ponds, glaciers > 1 km^{2} (0.386 sq mi or 247 acres) and river estuaries.

Quérénaing (French pronunciation: [keʁenɛ̃]) is a commune in the Nord department in northern France.

== Heraldry ==
| Arms of Quérénaing | The arms of Quérénaing are blazoned : Or, a cross engrailed gules. (Artres, Bettrechies, Cerfontaine, Eth, Lesquin, Obies, Quérénaing, Semousies, Wambrechies and Warlaing use the same arms.) |

== See also ==
- Communes of the Nord department
