= Lesquin =

- Commune
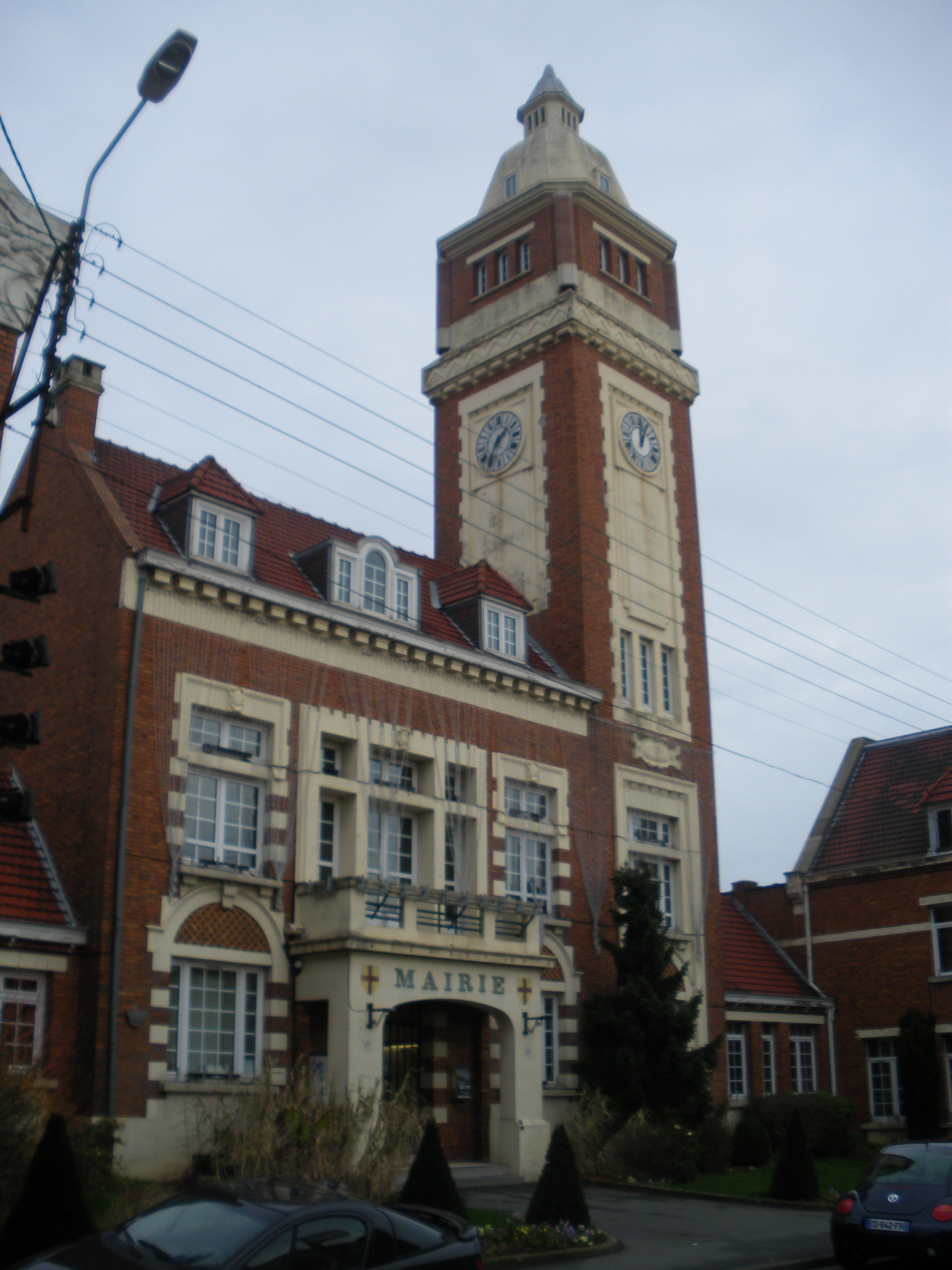
- The town hall in Lesquin

- Coat of arms
- Location of Lesquin
- Location within France Location within Hauts-de-France
- Coordinates: 50°35′26″N 3°06′42″E
- Country: France
- Region: Hauts-de-France
- Department: Nord
- Arrondissement: Lille
- Canton: Templeuve-en-Pévèle
- Intercommunality: Métropole Européenne de Lille

Government
  - Mayor (2020–2026): Jean-Marc Ambroziewicz
- Area^{1}: 8.41 km^{2} (3.25 sq mi)
- Highest elevation: 58 m (190 ft)
- Lowest elevation: 35 m (115 ft)
- Population (2023): 9,600
  - Density: 1,100/km^{2} (3,000/sq mi)
- Time zone: UTC+01:00 (CET)
  - Summer (DST): UTC+02:00 (CEST)
- INSEE/Postal code: 59343 /59810
- ^{1} French Land Register data, which excludes lakes, ponds, glaciers > 1 km^{2} (0.386 sq mi or 247 acres) and river estuaries.

Lesquin (French pronunciation: [lekɛ̃]) is a commune in the department of Nord, northern France.

== Population ==
Historical population
Year	Pop.	±% p.a.
1968	4,319	—
1975	5,302	+2.97%
1982	5,311	+0.02%
1990	5,660	+0.80%
1999	6,010	+0.67%
2007	6,395	+0.78%
2012	6,690	+0.91%
2017	8,259	+4.30%
2023	9,600	+2.54%
Source: INSEE

== Heraldry ==
Arms of Lesquin	The arms of Lesquin are blazoned: Or, a cross engrailed gules. (Artres, Bettrechies, Cerfontaine, Eth, Lesquin, Obies, Quérénaing, Semousies, Wambrechies and Warlaing use the same arms.)

== Economy ==
When Flandre Air existed, it had its head office at Lille Airport and in Lesquin. On 30 March 2001 Flandre, Proteus Airlines, and Regional Airlines merged into Régional, itself merged into HOP! in 2013.

== Sport ==
Lesquin is the home of Championnat de France Amateurs club, US Lesquin.

== Airport ==
Lille Airport is located in Lesquin.

== See also ==
- Communes of the Nord department
