= Marquette-lez-Lille =

- Commune
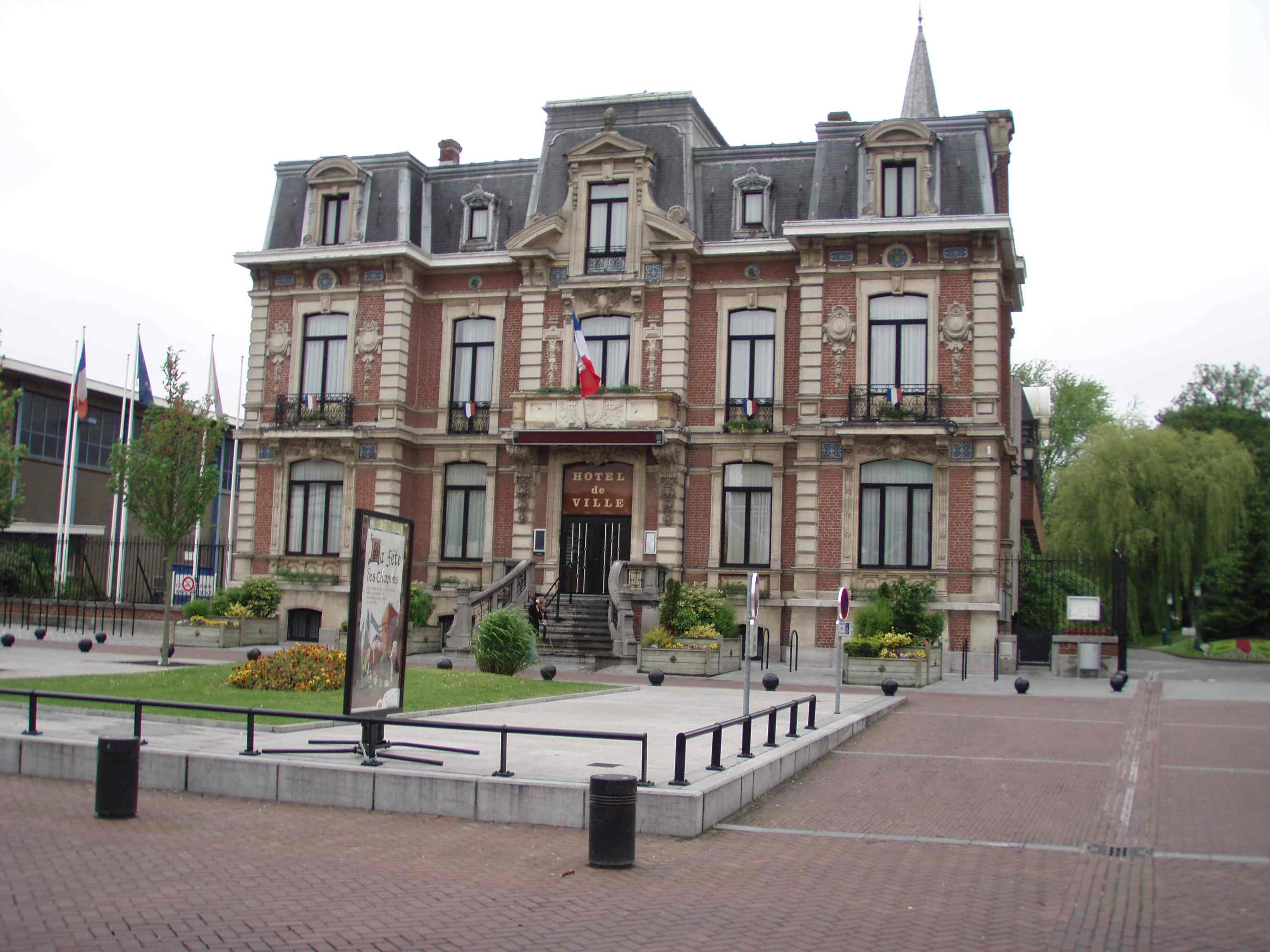
- The town hall in Marquette-lez-Lille

- Coat of arms
- Location of Marquette-lez-Lille
- Location within France Location within Hauts-de-France
- Coordinates: 50°40′35″N 3°04′00″E
- Country: France
- Region: Hauts-de-France
- Department: Nord
- Arrondissement: Lille
- Canton: Lille-1
- Intercommunality: Métropole Européenne de Lille

Government
  - Mayor (2020–2026): Dominique Legrand
- Area^{1}: 4.86 km^{2} (1.88 sq mi)
- Elevation: 15 m (49 ft)
- Highest elevation: 23 m (75 ft)
- Lowest elevation: 16 m (52 ft)
- Population (2023): 12,622
  - Density: 2,600/km^{2} (6,730/sq mi)
- Time zone: UTC+01:00 (CET)
  - Summer (DST): UTC+02:00 (CEST)
- INSEE/Postal code: 59386 /59520
- ^{1} French Land Register data, which excludes lakes, ponds, glaciers > 1 km^{2} (0.386 sq mi or 247 acres) and river estuaries.

Marquette-lez-Lille (French pronunciation: [maʁkɛt le lil], literally Marquette near Lille; Dutch: Market(t)e) is a commune in the Nord department in northern France. It is part of the Métropole Européenne de Lille.

== Population ==
Historical population
Year	Pop.	±% p.a.
1968	9,007	—
1975	8,244	−1.26%
1982	7,880	−0.64%
1990	11,013	+4.27%
1999	10,822	−0.19%
2007	9,772	−1.27%
2012	10,226	+0.91%
2017	10,376	+0.29%
2023	12,622	+3.32%
Source: INSEE

== Monuments ==
- Grands Moulins de Paris

== Heraldry ==
Arms of Marquette-lez-Lille	The arms of Marquette-lez-Lille are blazoned : Azure, the name 'Marquette' bendwise between 2 bendlets argent.

== Twin towns ==
Marquette-lez-Lille is twinned with:

- Fredersdorf-Vogelsdorf, Germany
- Sleaford, Lincolnshire, England (since 1999)

== See also ==
- Communes of the Nord department
