= Semousies =

- Commune
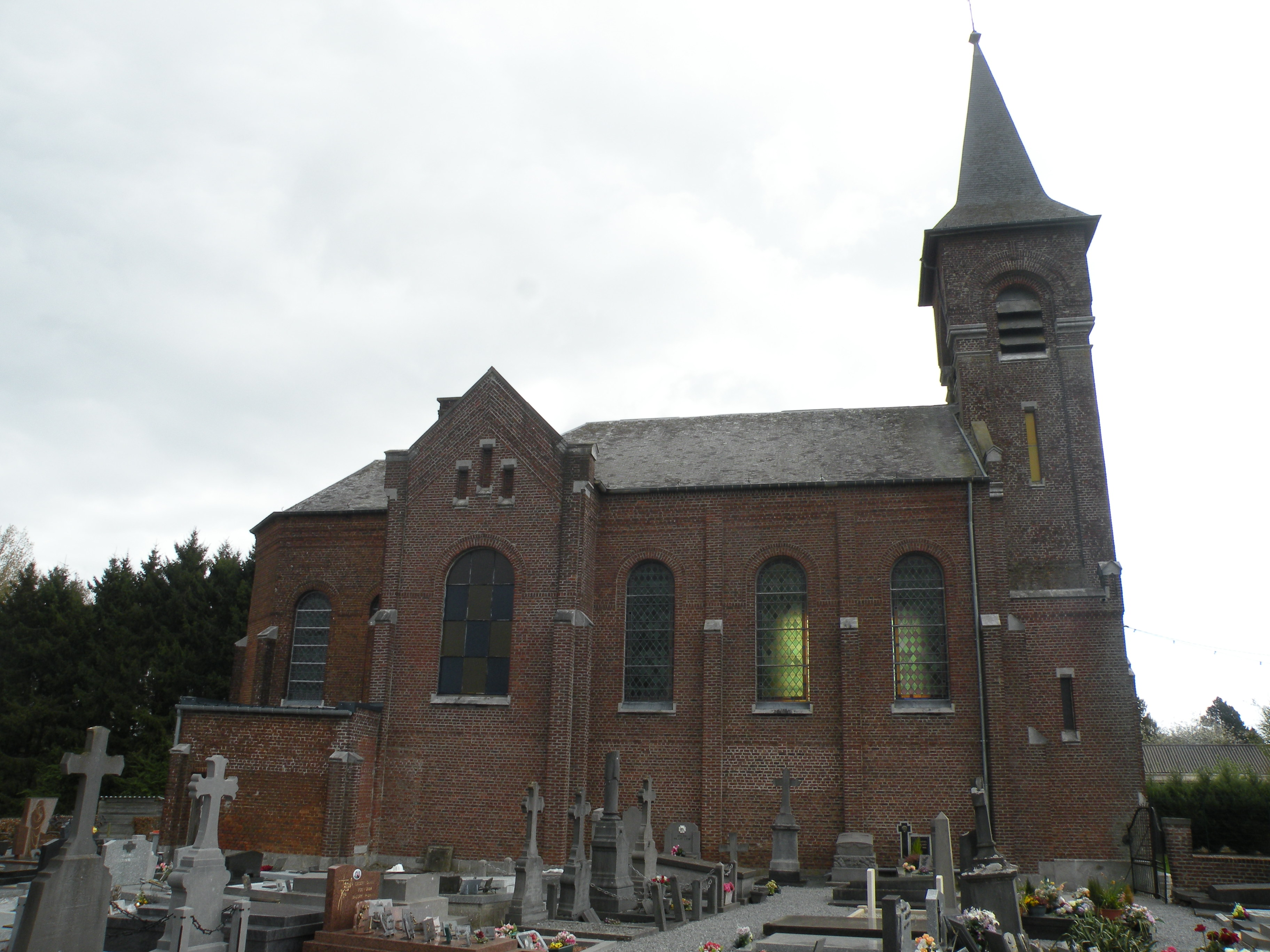
- The church in Semousies

- Coat of arms
- Location of Semousies
- Location within France Location within Hauts-de-France
- Coordinates: 50°09′52″N 3°57′40″E
- Country: France
- Region: Hauts-de-France
- Department: Nord
- Arrondissement: Avesnes-sur-Helpe
- Canton: Avesnes-sur-Helpe
- Intercommunality: Cœur de l'Avesnois

Government
  - Mayor (2020–2026): Jérôme Beugnies
- Area^{1}: 3.08 km^{2} (1.19 sq mi)
- Elevation: 193 m (633 ft)
- Highest elevation: 210 m (690 ft)
- Lowest elevation: 175 m (574 ft)
- Population (2023): 227
  - Density: 73.7/km^{2} (191/sq mi)
- Time zone: UTC+01:00 (CET)
  - Summer (DST): UTC+02:00 (CEST)
- INSEE/Postal code: 59563 /59440
- ^{1} French Land Register data, which excludes lakes, ponds, glaciers > 1 km^{2} (0.386 sq mi or 247 acres) and river estuaries.

Semousies (French pronunciation: [səmuzi]) is a commune in the Nord department in northern France.

The churchyard contains three Commonwealth war graves from the First World War.

== Heraldry ==
Arms of Semousies	The arms of Semousies are blazoned : Or, a cross engrailed gules. (Artres, Bettrechies, Cerfontaine, Eth, Lesquin, Obies, Quérénaing, Semousies, Wambrechies and Warlaing use the same arms.)

== See also ==
- Communes of the Nord department
