= Artres =

- Commune
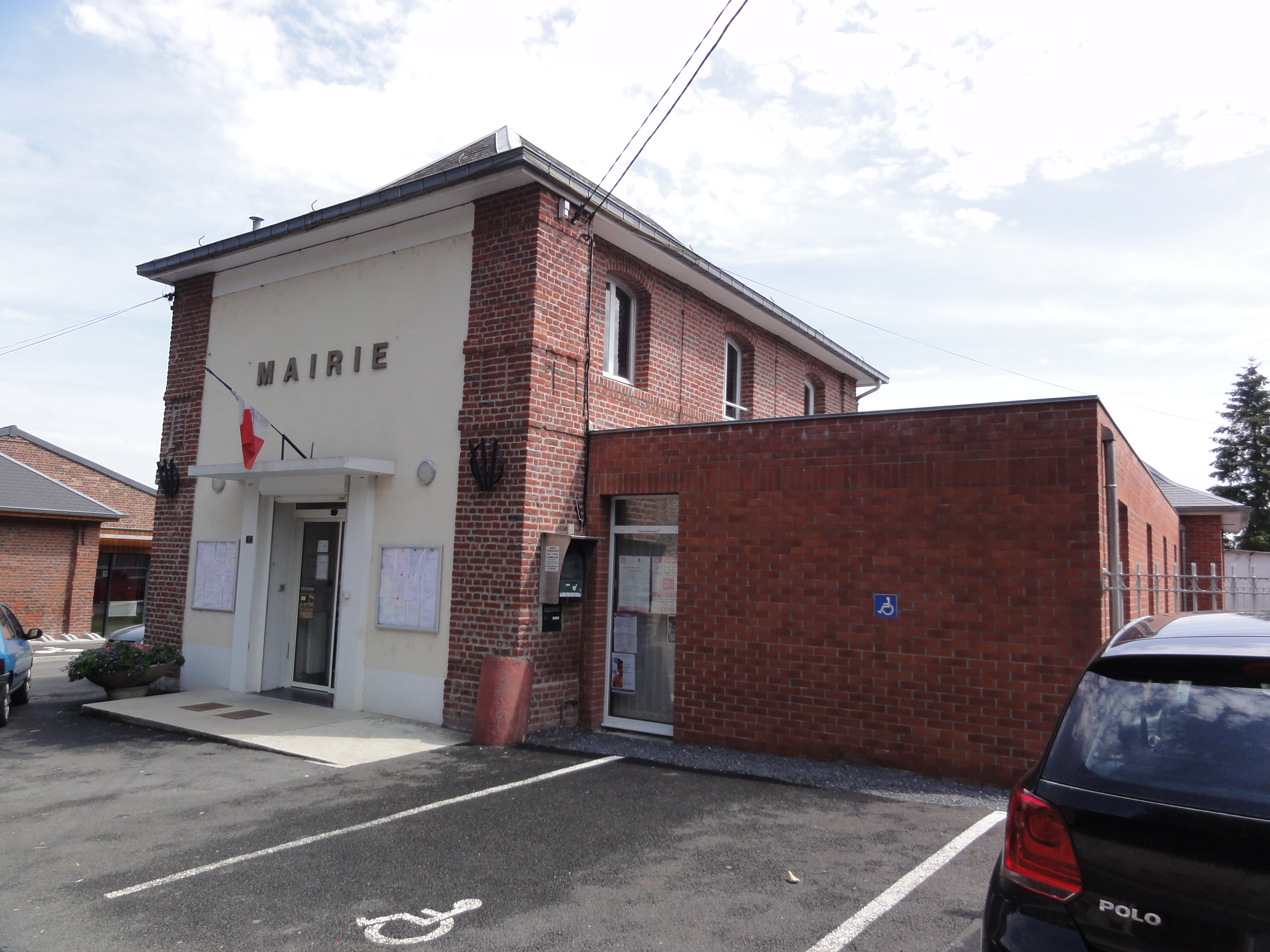
- Town hall

- Coat of arms
- Location of Artres
- Location within France Location within Hauts-de-France
- Coordinates: 50°17′39″N 3°32′28″E
- Country: France
- Region: Hauts-de-France
- Department: Nord
- Arrondissement: Valenciennes
- Canton: Aulnoy-lez-Valenciennes
- Intercommunality: CA Valenciennes Métropole

Government
  - Mayor (2020–2026): Liliane Andre
- Area^{1}: 6.59 km^{2} (2.54 sq mi)
- Elevation: 84 m (276 ft)
- Highest elevation: 96 m (315 ft)
- Lowest elevation: 39 m (128 ft)
- Population (2023): 1,082
  - Density: 164/km^{2} (425/sq mi)
- Time zone: UTC+01:00 (CET)
  - Summer (DST): UTC+02:00 (CEST)
- INSEE/Postal code: 59019 /59269
- ^{1} French Land Register data, which excludes lakes, ponds, glaciers > 1 km^{2} (0.386 sq mi or 247 acres) and river estuaries.

Artres (French pronunciation: [aʁtʁ]) is a commune in the Nord department in northern France. A group of grave objects from a Frankish noble lady was found in Artres in the nineteenth century. Known as the Artres Treasure, it is now mostly in the British Museum.

== Population ==
Historical population
Year	Pop.	±% p.a.
1968	905	—
1975	853	−0.84%
1982	979	+1.99%
1990	1,087	+1.32%
1999	1,071	−0.16%
2007	1,057	−0.16%
2012	1,021	−0.69%
2017	1,057	+0.70%
2023	1,082	+0.39%
Source: INSEE

== Heraldry ==
Arms of Artres	The arms of Artres are blazoned : Or, a cross engrailed gules. (Artres, Bettrechies, Cerfontaine, Eth, Lesquin, Obies, Quérénaing, Semousies, Wambrechies and Warlaing use the same arms.)

== See also ==
- Communes of the Nord department
