= Saint-André-lez-Lille =

- Commune
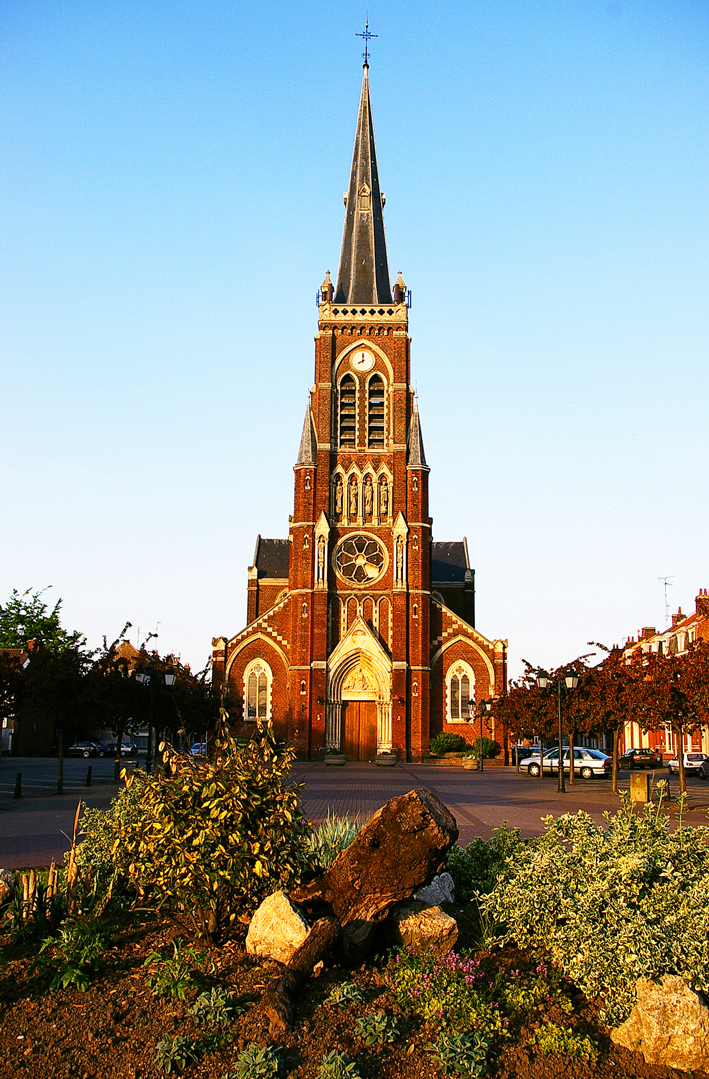
- Church of Saint André

- Coat of arms
- Location of Saint-André-lez-Lille
- Location within France Location within Hauts-de-France
- Coordinates: 50°39′39″N 3°02′42″E
- Country: France
- Region: Hauts-de-France
- Department: Nord
- Arrondissement: Lille
- Canton: Lille-1
- Intercommunality: Métropole Européenne de Lille

Government
  - Mayor (2020–2026): Élisabeth Masse
- Area^{1}: 3.16 km^{2} (1.22 sq mi)
- Elevation: 15 m (49 ft)
- Highest elevation: 22 m (72 ft)
- Lowest elevation: 16 m (52 ft)
- Population (2023): 13,233
  - Density: 4,190/km^{2} (10,800/sq mi)
- Time zone: UTC+01:00 (CET)
  - Summer (DST): UTC+02:00 (CEST)
- INSEE/Postal code: 59527 /59350
- ^{1} French Land Register data, which excludes lakes, ponds, glaciers > 1 km^{2} (0.386 sq mi or 247 acres) and river estuaries.

Saint-André-lez-Lille (French pronunciation: [sɛ̃t‿ɑ̃dʁe le lil], literally Saint-André near Lille; Dutch: Sint-Andries or Sint-Andries-Rijsel, before 1991: Saint-André) is a commune in the Nord department in northern France. It is part of the Métropole Européenne de Lille.

== Population ==
Historical population
Year	Pop.	±% p.a.
1968	11,782	—
1975	12,443	+0.78%
1982	10,821	−1.98%
1990	10,098	−0.86%
1999	10,113	+0.02%
2007	10,852	+0.89%
2012	11,246	+0.72%
2017	12,608	+2.31%
2023	13,233	+0.81%
Source: INSEE

== Heraldry ==
Arms of Saint-André-lez-Lille	The arms of Saint-André-lez-Lille are blazoned : Per fess 1: Gules, the door of the abbey of Marquette Or; 2: Azure, in fess 3 capes ermine on swords palewise argent.

== Twin towns – sister cities ==
Saint-André-lez-Lille is twinned with:

- Dormagen, Germany
- St Mary's Bay, England, United Kingdom
- Wieliczka, Poland

== See also ==
- Communes of the Nord department
