= Cerfontaine, Nord =

Cerfontaine
- Commune
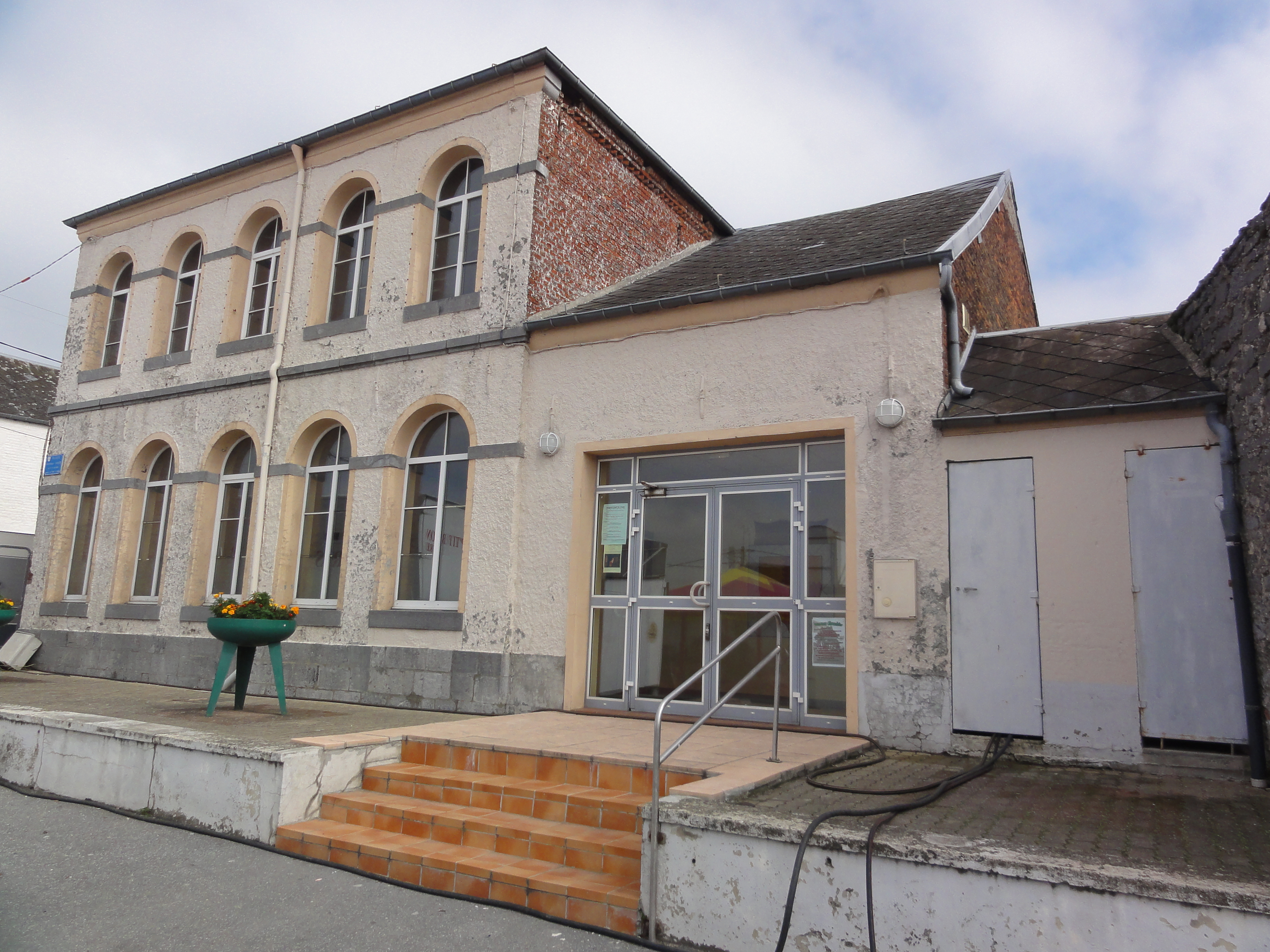
- The communal hall in Cerfontaine

- Coat of arms
- Location of Cerfontaine
- Location within France Location within Hauts-de-France
- Coordinates: 50°15′42″N 4°01′41″E
- Country: France
- Region: Hauts-de-France
- Department: Nord
- Arrondissement: Avesnes-sur-Helpe
- Canton: Fourmies
- Intercommunality: CA Maubeuge Val de Sambre

Government
  - Mayor (2020–2026): Fabrice Piette
- Area^{1}: 3.87 km^{2} (1.49 sq mi)
- Elevation: 156 m (512 ft)
- Highest elevation: 183 m (600 ft)
- Lowest elevation: 135 m (443 ft)
- Population (2023): 646
  - Density: 167/km^{2} (432/sq mi)
- Time zone: UTC+01:00 (CET)
  - Summer (DST): UTC+02:00 (CEST)
- INSEE/Postal code: 59142 /59680
- ^{1} French Land Register data, which excludes lakes, ponds, glaciers > 1 km^{2} (0.386 sq mi or 247 acres) and river estuaries.

Cerfontaine (French pronunciation: [sɛʁfɔ̃tɛn]) is a commune of the Nord department in northern France.

== Heraldry ==
Arms of Cerfontaine	The arms of Cerfontaine are blazoned : Or, a cross engrailed gules. (Artres, Bettrechies, Cerfontaine, Eth, Lesquin, Obies, Quérénaing, Semousies, Wambrechies and Warlaing use the same arms.)

== See also ==
- Communes of the Nord department
