= Cantons of the Nord department =

The following is a list of the 41 cantons of the Nord department, in France, following the French canton reorganisation which came into effect in March 2015:

- Aniche: 26 communes
- Annœullin: 24 communes
- Anzin: 6 communes
- Armentières: 11 communes
- Aulnoye-Aymeries: 38 communes
- Aulnoy-lez-Valenciennes: 20 communes
- Avesnes-sur-Helpe: 52 communes
- Bailleul: 23 communes
- Cambrai: 27 communes
- Le Cateau-Cambrésis: 56 communes
- Caudry: 33 communes
- Coudekerque-Branche: 9 communes
- Croix: 5 communes
- Denain: 18 communes
- Douai: 7 communes
- Dunkerque-1: 1 commune
- Dunkerque-2: 5 communes
- Faches-Thumesnil: 12 communes
- Fourmies: 46 communes
- Grande-Synthe: 14 communes
- Hazebrouck: 16 communes
- Lambersart: 8 communes
- Lille-1: 5 communes
- Lille-2: 4 communes
- Lille-3: 2 communes
- Lille-4: 3 communes
- Lille-5: 1 commune
- Lille-6: 10 communes
- Marly: 17 communes
- Maubeuge: 14 communes
- Orchies: 16 communes
- Roubaix-1: 1 commune
- Roubaix-2: 3 commune
- Saint-Amand-les-Eaux: 19 communes
- Sin-le-Noble: 15 communes
- Templeuve-en-Pévèle: 32 communes
- Tourcoing-1: 4 communes
- Tourcoing-2: 1 commune
- Valenciennes: 2 communes
- Villeneuve-d'Ascq: 5 communes
- Wormhout: 45 communes
