= Canton of Marcq-en-Barœul =

Former French canton

Coordinates: 50°41′12″N 3°05′44″E

- Former canton
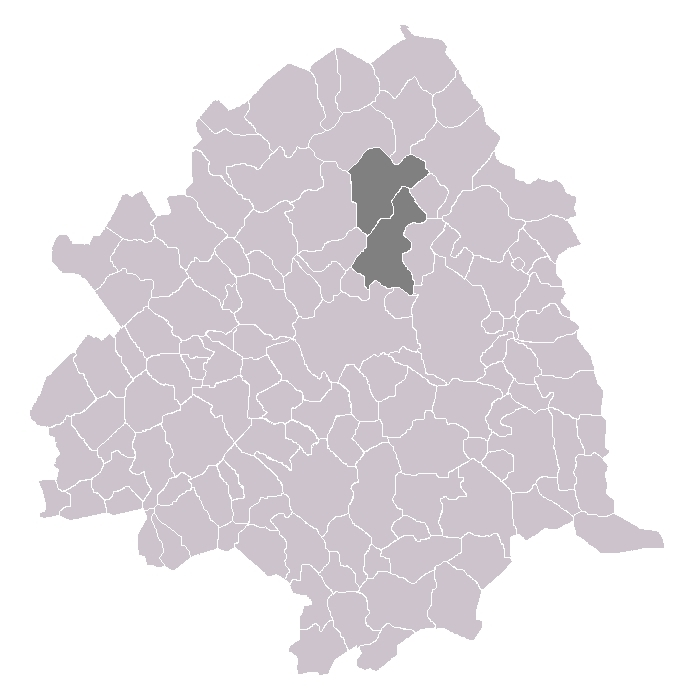
- Canton of Marcq-en-Barœul in the arrondissement of Lille
- Country: France
- Region: Hauts-de-France
- Department: Nord
- No. of communes: {{{nbcomm}}}
- Disbanded: 2014
- Area: 27.09 km^{2} (10.46 sq mi)
- Population (2012): 49,428
  - Density: 1,825/km^{2} (4,726/sq mi)

The canton of Marcq-en-Barœul (French: Canton de Marcq-en-Barœul) was a former French canton, located in the Nord department in the Nord-Pas-de-Calais region. It had 49,428 inhabitants (2012).

== Composition ==
The canton of Marcq-en-Barœul included the following municipalities:

List of municipalities in the canton before the 2014 redistricting
Name	INSEE code	Area (in km^{2})	Population (as of 2012)	Density (inhab./km^{2})
Marcq-en-Barœul (capital)	59378	14.04	39,600	2,821
Bondues	59090	13.05	9,828	753

== History ==
List of successive general councilors
Term	Name	Party	Other mandates	Ref.
1964-1968	Georges Lambrecq	UNR	Mayor of Marcq-en-Barœul (1959-1968)	
1968-1988	Michel Deplanck	UDR then RPR	First Deputy Mayor of Marcq-en-Barœul	
1988-2013	Jean-Rene Lecerf	RPR	Senator (2001-2015); Mayor of Marcq-en-Barœul since 1994; Elected in 2015 in the Canton of Lille-2	
2013-2015	Isabelle Frémaux	UMP	Former parliamentary attaché; Elected in 2015 in the Canton of Lille-2	

== See also ==
- Cantons of Nord
- Communes of Nord
