= Jean-René Lecerf =

French politician

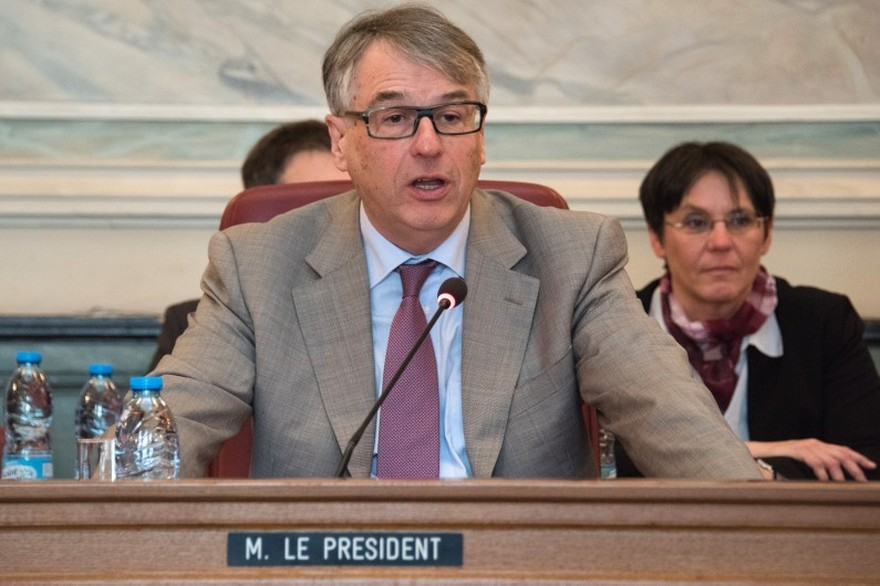
- Jean-René Lecerf in 2009

President of the Departmental Council of Nord
- In office 2 April 2015 – 1 July 2021
- Preceded by: Didier Manier
- Succeeded by: Christian Poiret

Municipal councilor of Lille
- In office 4 April 2014 – 28 June 2020
- President: Martine Aubry

Senator for Nord
- In office 1 October 2001 – 21 April 2015
- Succeeded by: Patrick Masclet

Mayor of Marcq-en-Barœul
- In office 13 September 1994 – 1 November 2001
- Preceded by: Serge Charles
- Succeeded by: Bernard Gérard

Departmental Councilor for Nord
- In office 22 March 2015 – 1 July 2021 Serving with Isabelle Frémaux
- Constituency: Canton of Lille-2
- In office 3 October 1988 – 31 December 2013
- Preceded by: Michel Deplanck
- Succeeded by: Isabelle Frémaux
- Constituency: Canton of Marcq-en-Barœul

Personal details
- Born: April 10, 1951 (age 75) Valenciennes
- Party: UMP then LR

Jean-René Lecerf (born 10 April 1951 in Valenciennes) is a French politician and a former member of the Senate of France. He represented the Nord department and was a member of the Union for a Popular Movement Party until 2015.

== Political background ==
=== Beginnings with Serge Charles ===
Jean-René Lecerf became involved in the Rally for the Republic party and became involved in the political world from the beginning of the 1980s, becoming the parliamentary assistant to Serge Charles, deputy-mayor of Marcq-en-Barœul. He became his chief of staff at the town hall of Marcq-en-Barœul from 1983, preferring to settle in this city rather than in Roubaix, the new mayor of this city elected in 1983, André Diligent, having also wanted make him his chief of staff.

He really made his debut in politics by winning the cantonal elections of 1988 in the canton of Marcq-en-Barœul and appearing on the list led by Serge Charles during the municipal elections of 1989, a list which made him win by a wide margin from the first round with 59.11% of the vote. Elected city councilor, he became first deputy to Serge Charles. When the latter died in 1994, he succeeded him at the head of the Marcquois executive.

A year later, the list he led to the municipal elections gathered more than 63% of the votes cast in the first round. He was therefore reappointed as mayor.

As a mayor, he strived to develop local facilities, at the level of the city, while associating himself with a series of metropolitan projects and intending to pay "particular attention to underprivileged neighborhoods, where unemployment can reach records”.

=== Political ascent: General Council of Nord ===
Elected General Councilor from Marcq-en-Barœul in 1988, the victory of the right in the 1992 cantonal elections brought him to first vice-presidency of the General Council of Nord, while Jacques Donnay (RPR) became the president of the Council.

Re-elected general councilor in March 1994, winning nearly 60% of the votes in the first round, he retained his first vice-presidency until March 1998, after which the left once again became the majority in the departmental assembly.

Following the defeat of the right, he became the leader of the opposition in the General Council by being elected president of the Union pour le Nord group.

=== Urban Community of Lille ===
In view of the political agreement for the management of the Urban Community of Lille, his election as head of the town hall of Marcq-en-Barœul led him to become vice-president of the community, chaired at that time by Pierre Mauroy, with whom he maintained cordial relations.

In charge of sanitation, he inherited several important files, including that of the cleanup of the Marque, a river that notably crosses the towns of Marcq-en-Barœul and Marquette-lez-Lille. Working in close collaboration with the mayors of the municipalities concerned, he succeeded in the process.

These functions also led him to become at the same time administrator of the Agence de l'eau Artois-Picardie (1995-2001), then chairman of the program commission of this public institution (1998-2001). Finally, he became vice-president of the Metropolitan Natural Space (French: Espace naturel métropolitain) from 1995 to 2001.

=== Election to the Senate ===
In September 2001, he led the list supported by the RPR and the UDF in the senatorial elections. Despite the many dissidences on the right, his list came second, collecting 902 votes from electors (16.27%), behind the socialist list led by Pierre Mauroy (29.99%), and obtained two seats. He was thus elected Senator for Nord.

Already in 1992, during the senatorial elections, he had put together with some of his political friends, including Alex Türk, a list "shifted, not to say dissident" against the "official" RPR-UDF list. “It was a kind of sling of the less old elected officials, not to say younger, to demonstrate to the traditional political formations that they had to renew themselves from the inside. To everyone's amazement, we had two elected against three for the official list”, he underlined at the time.

With the accumulation of mandates, he decided to give up his post of municipal councilor, leaving his chair as mayor to his first deputy, Bernard Gérard. This resignation led de facto to his departure from the Urban Community of Lille, as he was no longer a member of a municipal council.

== Senate activities from 2001 to 2015 ==
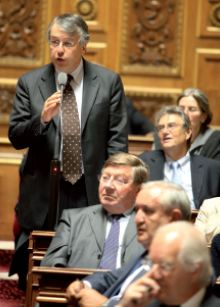
Jean-René Lecerf, during a session of questions to the government in the Senate, in 2009

After having sat from October 2001 to June 2002 within the Social Affairs Commission, Jean-René Lecerf became a member and then vice-president of the Law Commission of the French Senate. He was also a member of the High Council of the public sector from 2002 to 2004.

He was also a member of the European Affairs Committee.

He was a rapporteur for a certain number of important bills, such as that on the creation of the Equal Opportunities and Anti-Discrimination Commission (HALDE) or that relating to the prevention of delinquency. In 2007, he became rapporteur for the opinion of the Law Commission on the "Prison Administration" program of finance bills.

Very involved in legal issues, he was particularly invested in the issue of prisons, the right to asylum and the fight against discrimination. In particular, he has been a member of the Superior Council of the prison administration since 2008 and sits on the Commission for monitoring pre-trial detention as well as on the National Commission for Exceptional Admission to residence.

He was also a member of the boards of directors of the French Office for the Protection of Refugees and Stateless Persons (OFPRA) and the Conservatory of Coastal Spaces and Lakeshores. Finally, he was a member of the Court of Justice of the Republic.

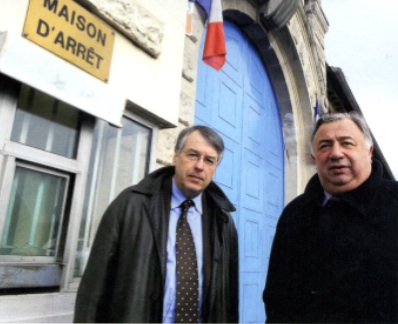
Jean-René Lecerf with Gérard Larcher, President of the Senate, during a visit to Loos prison in January 2009

He was notably the rapporteur of the penitentiary law in March 2009. The debates around this bill have also been the occasion for disagreements between the Government (represented by Rachida Dati then Michèle Alliot-Marie) and the senatorial majority. With the support of his fellow senators in the Law Commission and then in the Joint Parity Court, Jean-René Lecerf succeeded in safeguarding the principle of individual confinement in particular. The Senate had also unanimously adopted the proposals of the Commission and its rapporteur.

In September 2009, he was rapporteur on the reform of the Superior Council of the Judiciary, which aimed to consolidate the referral by litigants to the Superior Council of the Judiciary, referral adopted by the constituent power during the constitutional reform of July 2008.

On 21 October 2009 he was appointed rapporteur, for the Senate, of the bill aimed at reducing the risk of criminal recidivism and containing various provisions of criminal procedure. This bill stemmed in particular from the strong media coverage surrounding the Hodeau affair and the Évrard affair. Attentive to the progress of these cases and having had the opportunity to meet Francis Évrard during a visit to the prison of Sequedin, he revealed a certain number of avenues in order to fight against recidivism, including the obligation of care and medical monitoring.

On 1 November 2009 he co-signed with 23 of his fellow senators, including Jean-Pierre Raffarin, a column in Le Journal du Dimanche entitled "Pourquoi nous ne voterons pas la réforme de la taxe professionnelle" (transl. Why we will not vote for the reform of the business tax). It expressed itself in this capacity for greater coherence in the reforms of local authorities (dealing with competences and then their financing) and for better consideration of the autonomy of local authorities.

On 27 July 2010 he tabled a bill relating to the protection of identity aimed at "equipping national identity cards with secure electronic chips which not only will contain digitized biometric data but will also be able to offer their holders new services such as 'remote authentication and electronic signature'". The technical relevance of this proposal had been the subject of criticism from various online media, especially since its filing shortly preceded the demonstrations of vulnerability of the secure electronic chips of the English and German national cards.

In November 2014, he presented a report entitled "The fight against discrimination: from incantation to action" with Esther Benbassa (EELV). For Malika Sorel, former member of the High Council for Integration, these proposals were “dangerous, because they work to exacerbate tensions on our territory."

Jean-René Lecerf left the Senate on 21 April 2015 to Patrick Masclet to devote himself to the presidency of the departmental council of Nord.

== After senate ==
=== September 2011 senatorial elections ===
On the strength of his senatorial record, he announced on 25 June 2011 that he would be a candidate for re-election in the senatorial elections of September 2011.

On this occasion, he presented himself at the head of a gathering list "of the right-wing and center-right humanist family" made up of:

- Valérie Létard, outgoing senator (The Centrists), former minister and president of the community of agglomeration of Valenciennes,
- Patrick Masclet, mayor (UMP) of Arleux, regional councilor and president of the Association of mayors of Nord,
- Béatrice Descamps, mayor (DVD) of Méteren and former senator,
- Alain Poyart, mayor (UMP) of Avesnes-sur-Helpe, departmental councilor for Nord and former deputy.

Although not invested by the UMP, the list came in second position behind the socialist list and, with 18.34% of the vote, ahead of the other right-wing lists, those of Alex Türk (10.35%) and Jacques Legendre (9.67%). Only his list managed, on the right, to obtain two elected officials and to renew his two outgoing ones.

=== Municipal elections of March 2014 in Lille ===
He was the head of the UMP-UDI list in the municipal elections of March 2014, facing outgoing mayor Martine Aubry. The list of the latter won in the second round with 52.05% of the vote, against 29.71% for that of Jean-René Lecerf.

=== March 2015 departmental elections ===
Jean-René Lecerf was re-elected in the first round during the departmental elections in tandem with Isabelle Frémaux in the canton of Lille-2.

He was elected president of the departmental council of Nord on 2 April 2015 by the new UMP-UDI majority.
