= Claude Pringalle =

Belgian-born French politician (1931–2025)

Deputy of the French National Assembly
- In office 2 April 1993 – 21 April 1997
- Preceded by: Jean Le Garrec
- Succeeded by: Brigitte Douay
- Constituency: Nord's 18th constituency
- In office 7 May 1978 – 22 May 1981
- Preceded by: Jacques Legendre
- Succeeded by: Jean Le Garrec
- Constituency: Nord's 16th constituency
- In office 2 May 1977 – 2 April 1978
- Preceded by: Jacques Legendre
- Succeeded by: Jacques Legendre

Mayor of Séranvillers-Forenville
- In office March 1977 – March 2008
- Succeeded by: Marie-Bernadette Buisset-Lavalard

Member of the General Council of Nord for the Canton of Cambrai-Est
- In office September 1973 – March 2004
- Preceded by: Henri Cary
- Succeeded by: Brigitte Guidez

Personal details
- Born: 2 July 1931 Tournai, Belgium
- Died: 22 November 2025 (aged 94) Cambrai, France
- Political party: UDR; RPR; UMP
- Occupation: Horticulturist

Claude Pringalle (French: [klod pʁɛ̃gal]; 2 July 1931 – 22 November 2025) was a Belgian-born French politician of the Union of Democrats for the Republic (UDR), the RPR, and the UMP.

He served in the General Council of Nord from 1973 to 2004 and was mayor of Séranvillers-Forenville from 1977 to 2008. He served three terms as a deputy in the National Assembly; from 1977 to 1978, 1978 to 1981, and 1993 to 1997.

Pringalle died in Cambrai on 22 November 2025, at the age of 94.
