= Nord's 13th constituency =

Constituency of the National Assembly of France

13th constituency of the Nord
- inline Constituency of the National Assembly of France

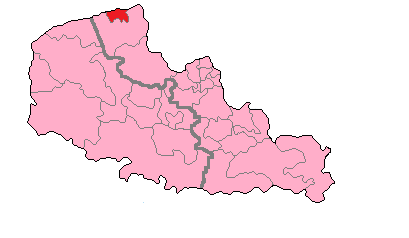
- Nord's 13th Constituency shown within Nord-Pas-de-Calais
- Deputy: Julien Gokel; Socialist
- Department: Nord
- Cantons: Coudekerque-Branche, Dunkerque-Ouest, Grande-Synthe
- Registered voters: 90,529

The 13th constituency of the Nord is a French legislative constituency in the Nord département.

== Description ==
Nord's 13th Constituency includes the west of the port city of Dunkerque on the English Channel coast as well as its large southern suburb of Coudekerque-Branche.

The elected conservative members during its first 30 years before switching to the Socialist Party in 1988. Since then the seat has been won by left wing candidates at every election except 1993 and a by-election in 1998.

In fiction it is the seat of the protagonist in the popular French TV series Baron Noir.

== Historic Representation ==
Election	Member	Party
1958	Auguste Damette	UNR
1962	Auguste Damette	UNR
1967	Auguste Damette	UDVe
1968	Auguste Damette	UDR
1973	Auguste Damette	UDR
1978	Maurice Sergheraert	SE
1981	Maurice Sergheraert	SE
1986	Proportional representation - no election by constituency	
1988	André Delattre	PS
1993	Emmanuel Dewees	RPR
1997	Michel Delebarre	PS
1998	Franck Dhersin	DL
2002	Michel Delebarre	PS
2007	Michel Delebarre	PS
2012	Christian Hutin	MRC
2017	Christian Hutin	DVG
2022	Christine Decodts	DVC
2024	Julien Gokel	PS

== Election results ==
=== 2024 ===
Legislative Election 2024: Nord's 13th constituency
Party	Candidate	Votes	%	±%
RN	Maxence Accart	21,662	43,52%	
PS	Julien Gokel*	16,026	32,20%	
LFI (NFP)	Damien Lacroix	10,913	21,92%	
LO	Clément Bézine	1,175	2,36%	
Turnout		49,776	57,85	
Registered electors		86,045		
2nd round result
PS	Julien Gokel	26,769	53.76	+21.46
RN	Maxence Accart	23,021	46.24	+2.72
Turnout		49,790	96.39	−0.56
Registered electors		51,656		
PS hold		Swing		

* PS dissident without the support of the New Popular Front alliance

=== 2022 ===
Legislative Election 2022: Nord's 13th constituency
Party	Candidate	Votes	%	±%
DVC (Ensemble)	Christine Decodts	11,317	32.56	+11.02
RN	Yohann Duval	10,506	30.23	+4.51
LFI (NUPÉS)	Damien Lacroix	8,394	24.15	+4.09
LR (UDC)	Véronique De Miribel	1,390	4.00	−0.12
REC	Eugénie Madelaine	1,056	3.04	N/A
PA	Alexis Peltier	950	2.73	N/A
LO	Clément Bézine	698	2.01	N/A
DIV	Maeva Menneboo	443	1.27	N/A
Turnout		34,754	41.16	−3.16
2nd round result
DVC (Ensemble)	Christine Decodts	16,497	52.29	N/A
RN	Yohann Duval	15,055	47.71	+11.03
Turnout		31,552	39.05	−1.85
DVC gain from DVG				

=== 2017 ===
Candidate	Label	First round		Second round	
Candidate	Label	Votes	%	Votes	%
Philippe Eymery	FN	9,893	25.72	12,478	36.68
Christian Hutin	DVG	9,507	24.72	21,538	63.32
Sarah Robin	REM	8,283	21.54		
Elio Berte-Langereau	FI	5,434	14.13		
Virginie Henocq	ECO	1,600	4.16		
Mickaëlle Lefèvre	UDI	1,584	4.12		
Delphine Castelli	PCF	680	1.77		
Anthony Simati	DIV	633	1.65		
Jacques Volant	EXG	500	1.30		
Catherine Mogis	DIV	254	0.66		
Christophe Legros	DIV	92	0.24		
Votes		38,460	100.00	34,016	100.00
Valid votes		38,460	97.20	34,016	93.15
Blank votes		837	2.12	1,797	4.92
Null votes		272	0.69	704	1.93
Turnout		39,569	44.32	36,517	40.90
Abstentions		49,715	55.68	52,767	59.10
Registered voters		89,284		89,284	
Source: Ministry of the Interior

=== 2012 ===
Legislative Election 2012: Nord's 13th constituency
Party	Candidate	Votes	%	±%
MRC	Christian Hutin	22,564	47.87	
FN	Philippe Eymery	10,982	23.30	
UMP	François Rosseel	7,034	14.92	
FG	David Thiebaut	2,243	4.76	
EELV	Marcel Lefevre	1,295	2.75	
Others	N/A	3,020		
Turnout		47,138	52.07	
2nd round result
MRC	Christian Hutin	28,874	64.73	
FN	Philippe Eymery	15,730	35.27	
Turnout		44,604	49.27	
MRC gain from PS				

=== 2007 ===
Legislative Election 2007: Nord's 13th constituency
Party	Candidate	Votes	%	±%
PS	Michel Delebarre	16,435	40.50	
UMP	Franck Dhersin	16,193	39.90	
MoDem	Sandrine Lejeune-Le Pallac	1,754	4.32	
FN	Ursula Maltese	1,432	3.53	
Far left	José Deswarte	919	2.26	
LV	Paulo-Serge Lopes	913	2.25	
Others	N/A	2,933		
Turnout		41,323	63.53	
2nd round result
PS	Michel Delebarre	22,338	53.12	
UMP	Franck Dhersin	18,712	46.88	
Turnout		43,428	66.77	
PS hold				

=== 2002 ===
Legislative Election 2002: Nord's 13th constituency
Party	Candidate	Votes	%	±%
PS	Michel Delebarre	15,522	38.02	
UMP	Franck Dhersin	14,393	35.25	
FN	Francoise Coolzaet	3,983	9.76	
MNR	Philippe Eymery	2,336	5.72	
LV	Philippe Rousselle	884	2.17	
Others	N/A	3,710		
Turnout		41,641	64.09	
2nd round result
PS	Michel Delebarre	19,797	51.61	
UMP	Franck Dhersin	18,562	48.39	
Turnout		40,867	62.90	
PS hold				

=== 1997 ===
Legislative Election 1997: Nord's 13th constituency
Party	Candidate	Votes	%	±%
PS	Michel Delebarre	15,728	37.59	
RPR	Emmanuel Dewees	10,655	25.47	
FN	Philippe Eymery	7,330	17.52	
PCF	Gérard Miroux	2,039	4.87	
LV	Marcel Lefèvre	1,354	3.24	
DVD	Véronique de Miribel	1,210	2.89	
LO	Jacques Volant	1,182	2.83	
Others	N/A	2,342		
Turnout		43,776	67.92	
2nd round result
PS	Michel Delebarre	24,262	56.90	
RPR	Emmanuel Dewees	18,378	43.10	
Turnout		45,505	70.60	
PS gain from RPR				

== Sources ==
- Official results of French elections from 1998: "Résultats électoraux officiels en France" (in French).
