= Le Garrec =

Le Garrec is a surname of Breton origin. Notable people with the surname include:

- Jean Le Garrec (1929–2023), French businessman and politician
- Léa Le Garrec (born 1993), French footballer
- Nolann Le Garrec (born 2002), French rugby union player.
- Stéphane Le Garrec (born 1969), French footballer and manager
