= Christine Decodts =

French politician

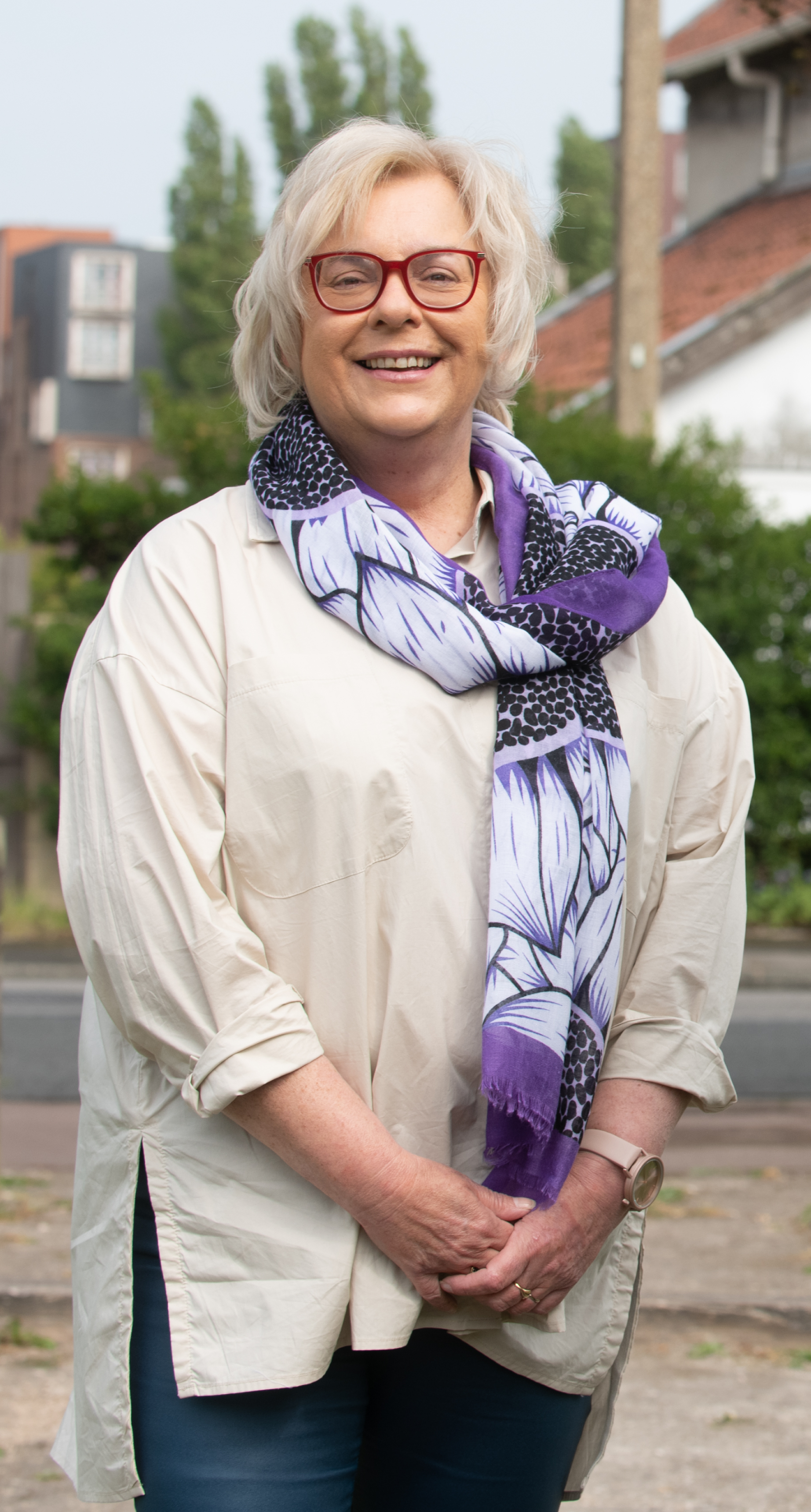
- Christine Decodts in 2022.

Member of the National Assembly for Nord's 13th constituency
- In office 22 June 2022 – 9 June 2024
- Preceded by: Christian Hutin
- Succeeded by: Julien Gokel

Personal details
- Born: 19 May 1966 (age 59) Dunkirk, France
- Party: Miscellaneous centre
- Other political affiliations: Ensemble Citoyens

Christine Decodts (born 19 May 1966) is a French politician from the miscellaneous centre (Ensemble) who represented Nord's 13th constituency in the National Assembly from 2022 to 2024.

== Biography ==
After studying in the fields of local social development and city policy, Christine Decodts began her career in 1988 in the associative field working with residents of priority neighborhoods in the city of Dunkirk. In 1995, she became director of city policy in Saint-Pol-sur-Mer where she remained for 23 years.

In 2018, Christine Decodts joined the urban community of Dunkirk as head of the area of success pathways and social transformation in the context of neighborhoods undergoing urban renewal.

Following the 2020 municipal elections, Christine Decodts became deputy mayor of Dunkirk in charge of work and professional integration and became president of the Entreprendre Ensemble association.

Christine Decodts has had several associative commitments. She was secretary at the national office of Neighborhood Authorities, vice-president of the European association of Neighborhood Authorities, administrator of the CCAS of Dunkirk, administrator of the Information Center on Women and Family Law, president of Adulys, Terri'Mouv and the two second chance schools located in Dunkirk and Boulogne-sur-Mer.

Christine Decodts is elected, in pair with Grégory Bartholomeus, departmental councilor of the North in the canton of Dunkerque in 2021.

On June 19, 2022, she was elected deputy in the thirteenth constituency of the North with 52.29% of the votes.

On September 22, 2022, due to the rule on the accumulation of mandates, she resigned from her mandate as deputy mayor of Dunkirk but remained president of the Entreprendre Ensemble association. Sitting within the Committee on Sustainable Development and Regional Planning in the Assembly, she is notably rapporteur for opinion of the nuclear bill.

Christine Decodts also becomes rapporteur for the green industry bill in July 2023.

From September 2023, Christine Decodts left the Sustainable Development and Regional Planning Committee to join the Parliamentary Committee on Finance, General Economy and Budgetary Control.

She retired at the 2024 French legislative election.
