= Bricout =

Bricout is a surname. Notable people with the surname include:

- Guy Bricout (born1944), French politician
- Jean-Louis Bricout (born 1957), French politician
