= Alexandre Dufosset =

French politician

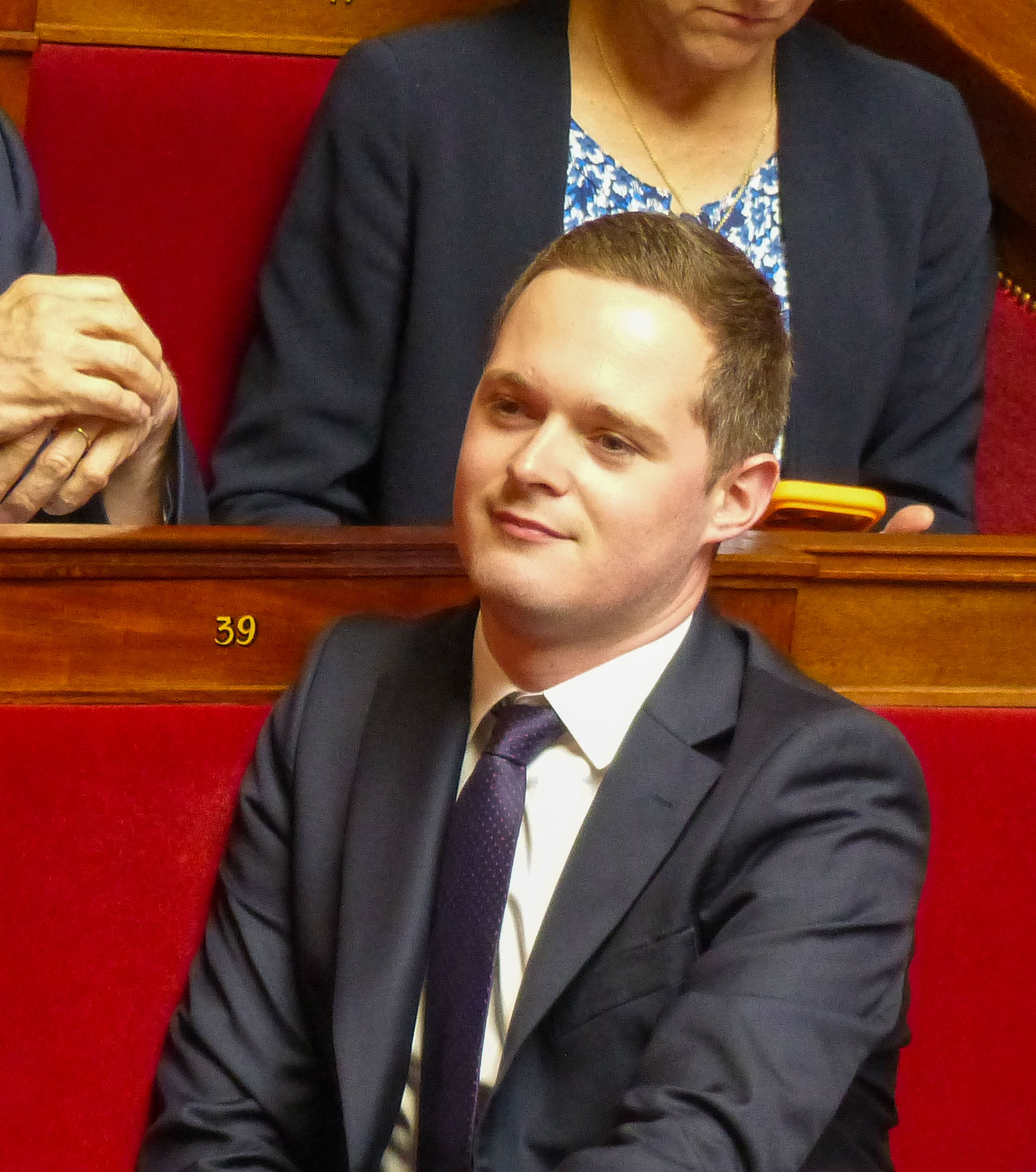

Member of the National Assembly for Nord's 18th constituency
- Incumbent
- Assumed office 18 July 2024
- Preceded by: Guy Bricout

Personal details
- Born: 24 August 1998 (age 27) Maubeuge, France
- Party: National Rally

Alexandre Dufosset (born 24 August 1998) is a French politician from National Rally.

== Career ==
Dufosset was a candidate for the 2024 French legislative election in Nord's 18th constituency. He won the seat in the first round with 52.51% of the vote.

After completing agricultural training at the Haussy rural family home, Alexandre Dufosset switched to studying customer relations for his Baccalauréat and then pursued a BTS in management through an apprenticeship with SNCF. He became an aide to Sébastien Chenu, vice-president of the National Rally and deputy of the Nord department, eventually serving as his chief of staff in 2021.

Dufosset is a municipal councilor in Aulnoy-lez-Valenciennes and a regional councilor for Hauts-de-France. He ran for the 2024 legislative elections in the Nord's 18th constituency (Cambrai, Caudry, Le Cateau-Cambrésis), where the National Rally's original candidate, Mélanie Disdier, did not run due to her recent election to the European Parliament three weeks before the election. His candidacy faced criticism from several local officials who accused him of being parachuted into the position. To everyone's surprise, Alexandre Dufosset was elected in the first round with 52.51% of the vote. He announced that he would resign from his position as a municipal councilor but would retain his seat on the regional council of Hauts-de-France.
