= Château du Vert-Bois =

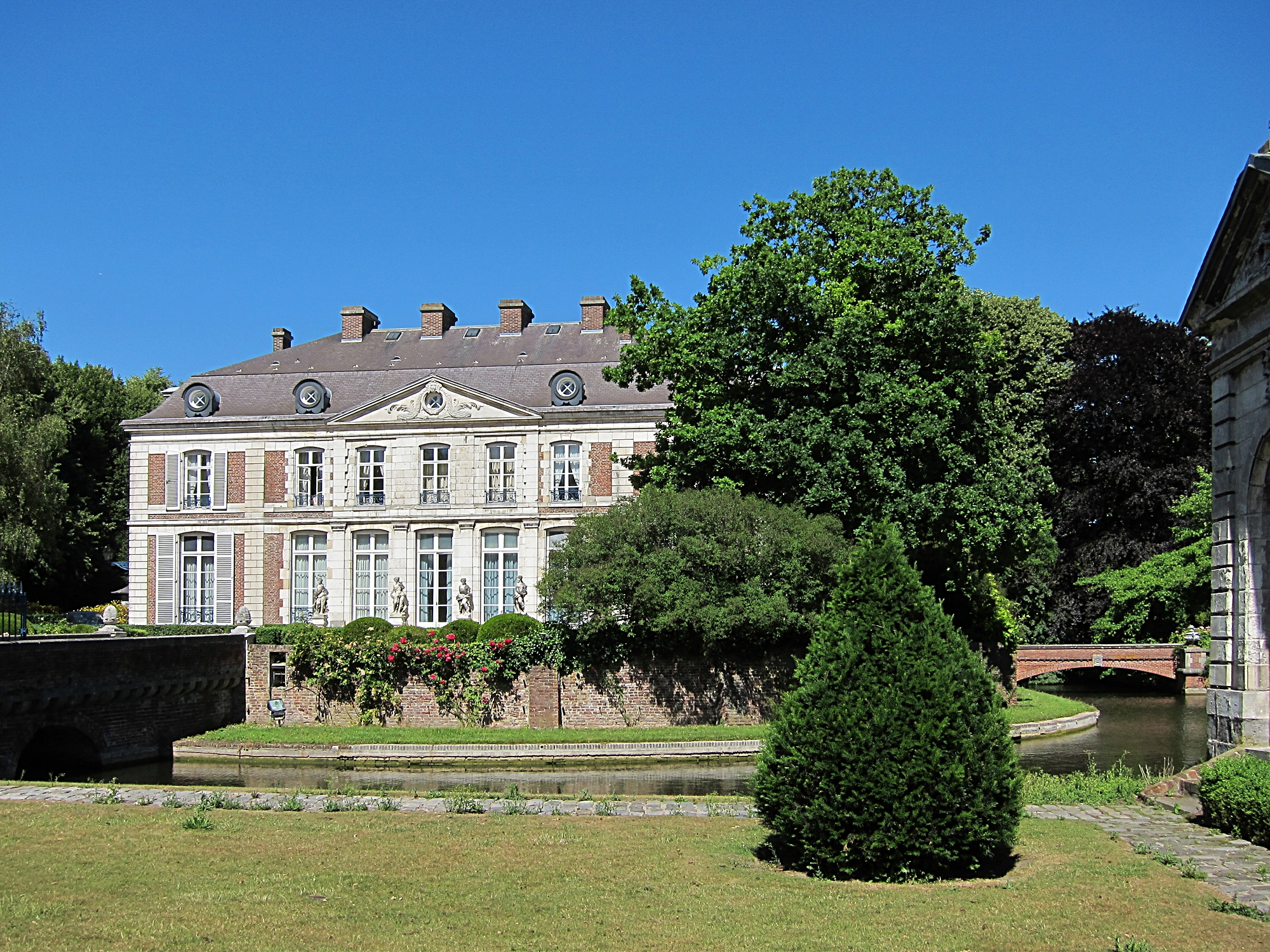
- Interactive map of the Château du Vert-Bois area

General information
- Type: château
- Location: Bondues, France
- Coordinates: 50.7119°N 3.1149°E
- Completed: 1777

The Château du Vert-Bois is a historic château in Bondues, Nord, France. It was completed in 1777. It has been listed as an official historical monument since 1962.
