= Tourcoing =

Tourcoing Tourco (Picard) Terkoeje (West Flemish)
- Commune
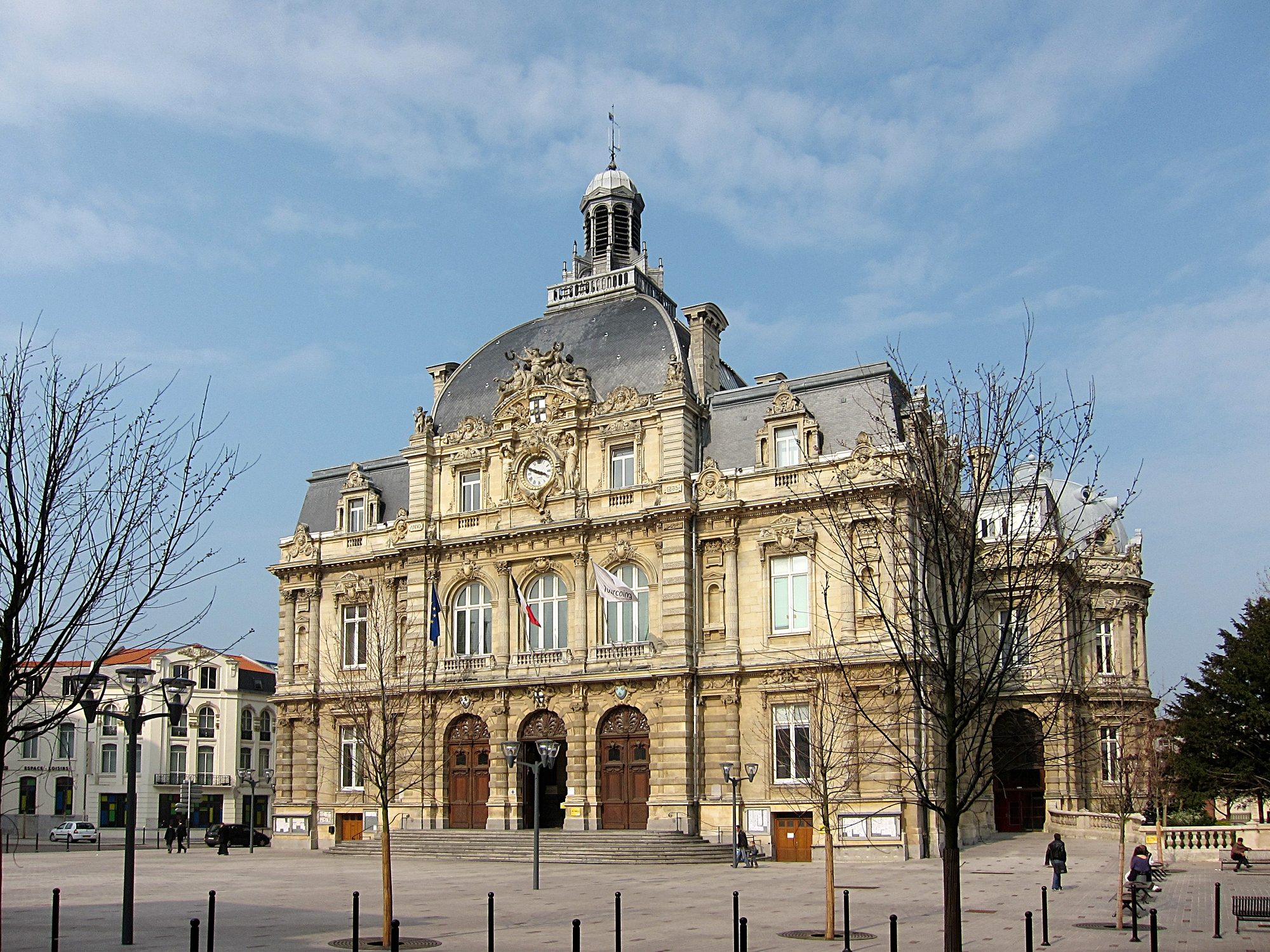
- Hôtel de Ville

- Flag Coat of arms
- Location of Tourcoing
- Location within France Location within Hauts-de-France
- Coordinates: 50°43′26″N 3°09′40″E
- Country: France
- Region: Hauts-de-France
- Department: Nord
- Arrondissement: Lille
- Canton: Tourcoing-1 and 2
- Intercommunality: Métropole Européenne de Lille

Government
  - Mayor (2020–2026): Doriane Bécue (DVC)
- Area^{1}: 15.19 km^{2} (5.86 sq mi)
- Elevation: 67 m (220 ft)
- Population (2023): 98,772
  - Density: 6,502/km^{2} (16,840/sq mi)
- Time zone: UTC+01:00 (CET)
  - Summer (DST): UTC+02:00 (CEST)
- INSEE/Postal code: 59599 /59200
- ^{1} French Land Register data, which excludes lakes, ponds, glaciers > 1 km^{2} (0.386 sq mi or 247 acres) and river estuaries.

Tourcoing (French: [tuʁkwɛ̃]; Dutch: Toerkonje [tuːrˈkɔɲə]; West Flemish: Terkoeje; Picard: Tourco) is a city in northern France on the Belgian border. It is designated municipally as a commune within the department of Nord. Located to the north-northeast of Lille, adjacent to Roubaix, Tourcoing is the chef-lieu of two cantons and the third largest city in the French region of Hauts-de-France ranked by population with about 99,000 inhabitants.

Together with the cities of Lille, Roubaix, Villeneuve-d'Ascq and eighty-six other communes, Tourcoing is part of four-city-centred metropolitan area inhabited by more than 1.1 million people: the Métropole Européenne de Lille. To a greater extent, Tourcoing belongs to a vast conurbation formed with the Belgian cities of Mouscron, Kortrijk and Tournai, which gave birth to the first European Grouping of Territorial Cooperation in January 2008, Lille–Kortrijk–Tournai with an aggregate of just over 2 million inhabitants.

== History ==
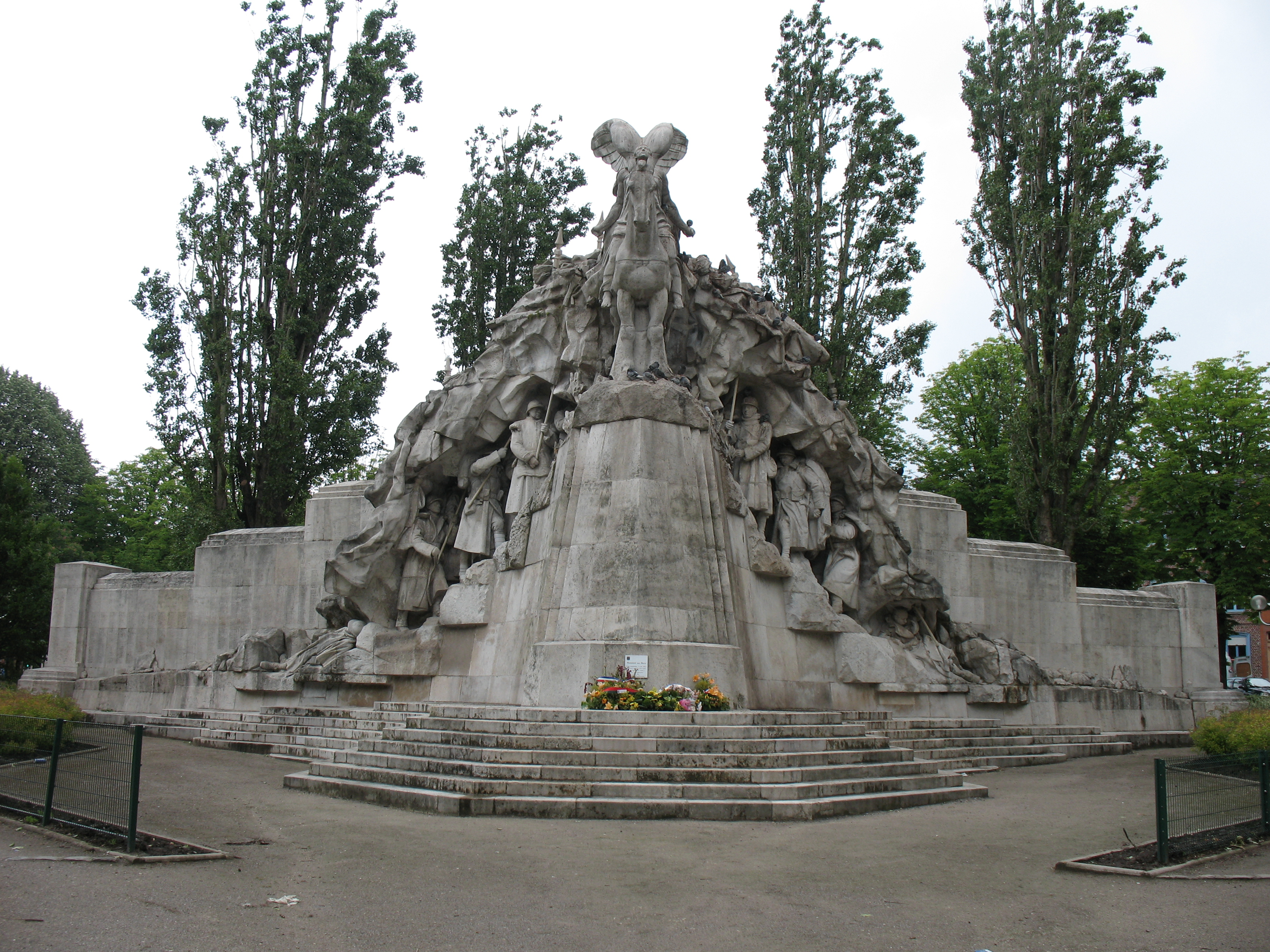
Place de la Victoire, Tourcoing

The city was the site of a significant victory for France during the French Revolutionary Wars. Marshal Charles Pichegru and his generals Joseph Souham and Jean Moreau defeated a combined force of British and Austrian troops in the Battle of Tourcoing on 29 Floréal II (18 May 1794).

== Population ==
Historical population

Year	Pop.	±% p.a.
1793	12,110	—
1800	11,380	−0.88%
1806	11,999	+0.89%
1821	14,661	+1.34%
1831	17,973	+2.06%
1836	19,966	+2.13%
1841	22,503	+2.42%
1846	26,834	+3.58%
1851	27,615	+0.58%
1856	29,646	+1.43%
1861	33,498	+2.47%
1866	38,262	+2.70%
1872	43,322	+2.09%

Year	Pop.	±% p.a.
1876	48,634	+2.93%
1881	51,895	+1.31%
1886	58,008	+2.25%
1891	65,477	+2.45%
1896	73,353	+2.30%
1901	79,243	+1.56%
1906	81,671	+0.61%
1911	82,644	+0.24%
1921	78,600	−0.50%
1926	81,379	+0.70%
1931	81,972	+0.15%
1936	78,393	−0.89%
1946	76,080	−0.30%

Year	Pop.	±% p.a.
1954	83,416	+1.16%
1962	89,258	+0.85%
1968	98,755	+1.70%
1975	102,239	+0.50%
1982	96,908	−0.76%
1990	93,765	−0.41%
1999	93,540	−0.03%
2007	92,118	−0.19%
2012	92,707	+0.13%
2017	97,368	+0.99%
2023	98,772	+0.24%

Source: EHESS and INSEE (1968-2023)

== Main sights ==
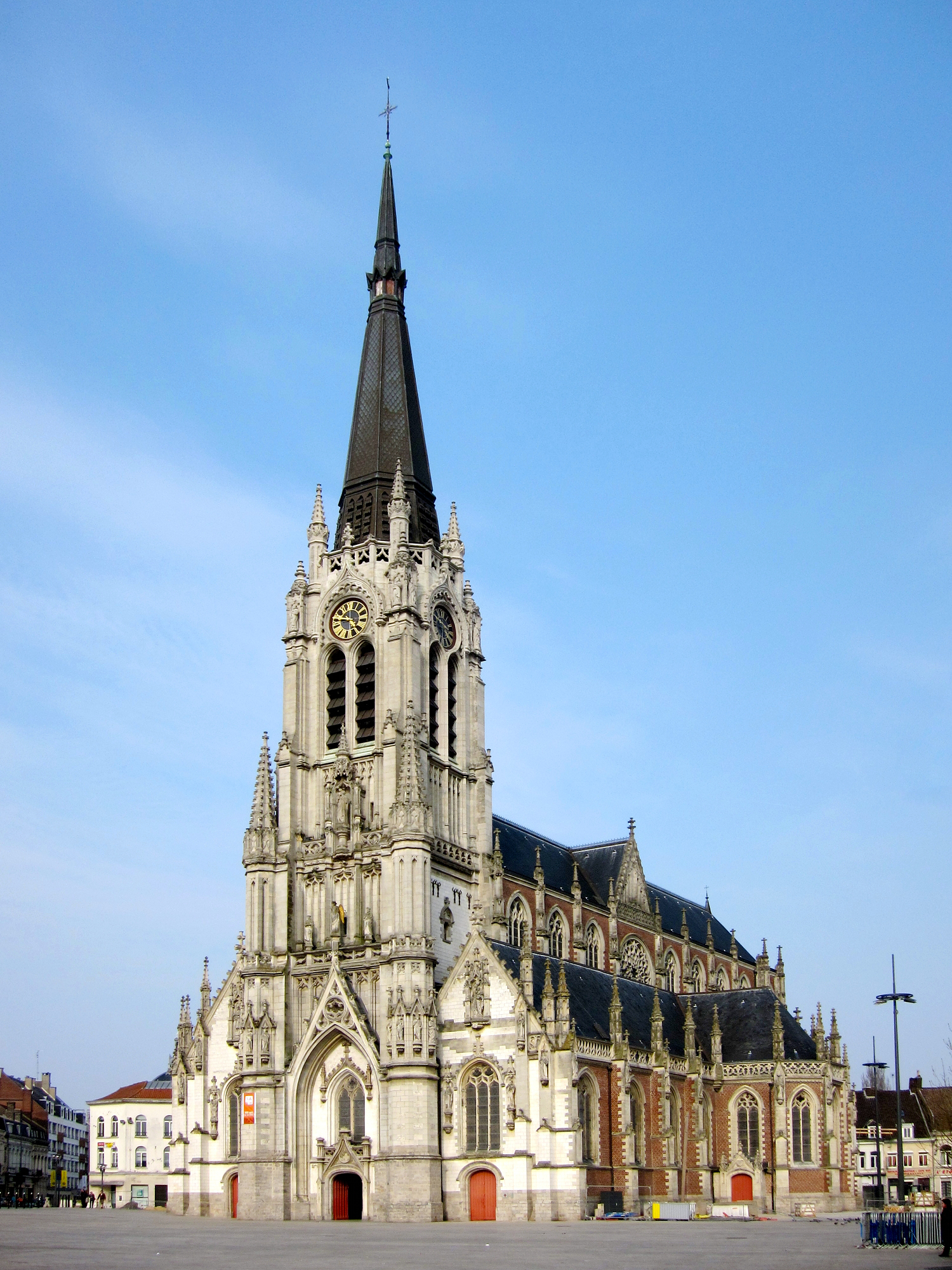
Church of St Christopher

- Church of St Christopher (15th-16th centuries), considered one of the most beautiful Neo-Gothic edifices of Nord. In stone and brickwork, it has an 80-metre (262-foot) high bell tower with more than 80 bells.
- Hospice de Havre, founded in 1260. The cloister and the chapel date from the seventeenth century.
- Hôtel de Ville (1885), in Second Empire style.
- Jardin botanique de Tourcoing, a botanical garden and arboretum.

== Transport ==
The Tourcoing station is a railway station offering direct connections to Lille and Paris (high speed trains), Kortrijk, Ostend, Ghent and Antwerp. The town was formerly served by the Somain-Halluin Railway. The nearest airports to Tourcoing are Lille Airport which is located 23 km away and Brussels Airport which is located 117 km away.

== Media ==
The main television channels that broadcast to the city are TF1, France 2, France 3, France 4, France 5 and M6. Local radio station that broadcast to Tourcoing is Ici Nord. The newspapers is served by La Voix du Nord and Nord éclair.

== Notable people ==
- Yohan Cabaye (born 1986), footballer
- Jean-Marc Degraeve (born 1971), chess grandmaster
- Stéphane Denève (born 1971), conductor
- Achille Desurmont (1828–1898), writer
- Brigitte Fossey (born 1946), actress
- Anna Gomis (born 1973), wrestler
- Henri Padou (1898–1981), water polo player and 1924 Olympic gold medallist
- Brigitte Lahaie (born 1955), pornstar
- Joseph-Charles Lefèbvre (1892–1973), bishop of Bourges, cardinal, cousin of
- Marcel Lefebvre (1905–1991), missionary priest and, later, archbishop, cousin of Joseph-Charles
- René Lefebvre (1879-1944), posthumously awarded Medaille militaire, father of Marcel
- Mr. Sam (born 1975), a popular deejay and producer running his own record label since 2008.
- Albert Roussel (1869–1937), composer
- Yves Devernay (1937–1990), organist

Guilbert de Lannoy (1545-c. 1601) and his son Jean de Lannoy (1575-c. 1605) were Protestants from Tourcoing who resettled in Leiden, Holland. Jean's son, Philip Delano (c. 1603 - c. 1681-82; born Philipe de la Noye or Philipe de Lannoy), was an early emigrant to the Plymouth Colony and progenitor of the prominent Delano family, which counts among its descendants prominent figures in American history, including president Franklin Roosevelt.

== Notable Startups ==
In 2013, Maxime Piquette and Charles De Potter founded iCreo, a digital audio company in Tourcoing. The company created RadioKing, a platform for internet radio, and Ausha, a platform for podcast hosting and marketing. It received support from regional funders, Nord France Amorquage and IRD Gestion. The company is now the platform for media outlets Le Figaro, Liberation, l'Équipe and AFP, as well as large corporations and independent content producers.

== International relations ==
=== Twin towns and sister cities ===
Tourcoing is twinned with:

- Biella, Italy
- Bottrop, Germany
- Jastrzębie-Zdrój, Poland
- Mitte (Berlin), Germany
- Mühlhausen, Germany
- Partyzanski (Minsk), Belarus

=== Other forms of cooperation ===
- Guimarães, Portugal
- Mouscron, Belgium
- Rochdale, England

== See also ==
- Battle of Tourcoing (1794)
- Free Institution of Sacred Heart
- Communes of the Nord department
- Verlaine Message Museum
- CO Roubaix-Tourcoing
