= Julien Gokel =

French politician (born 1983)

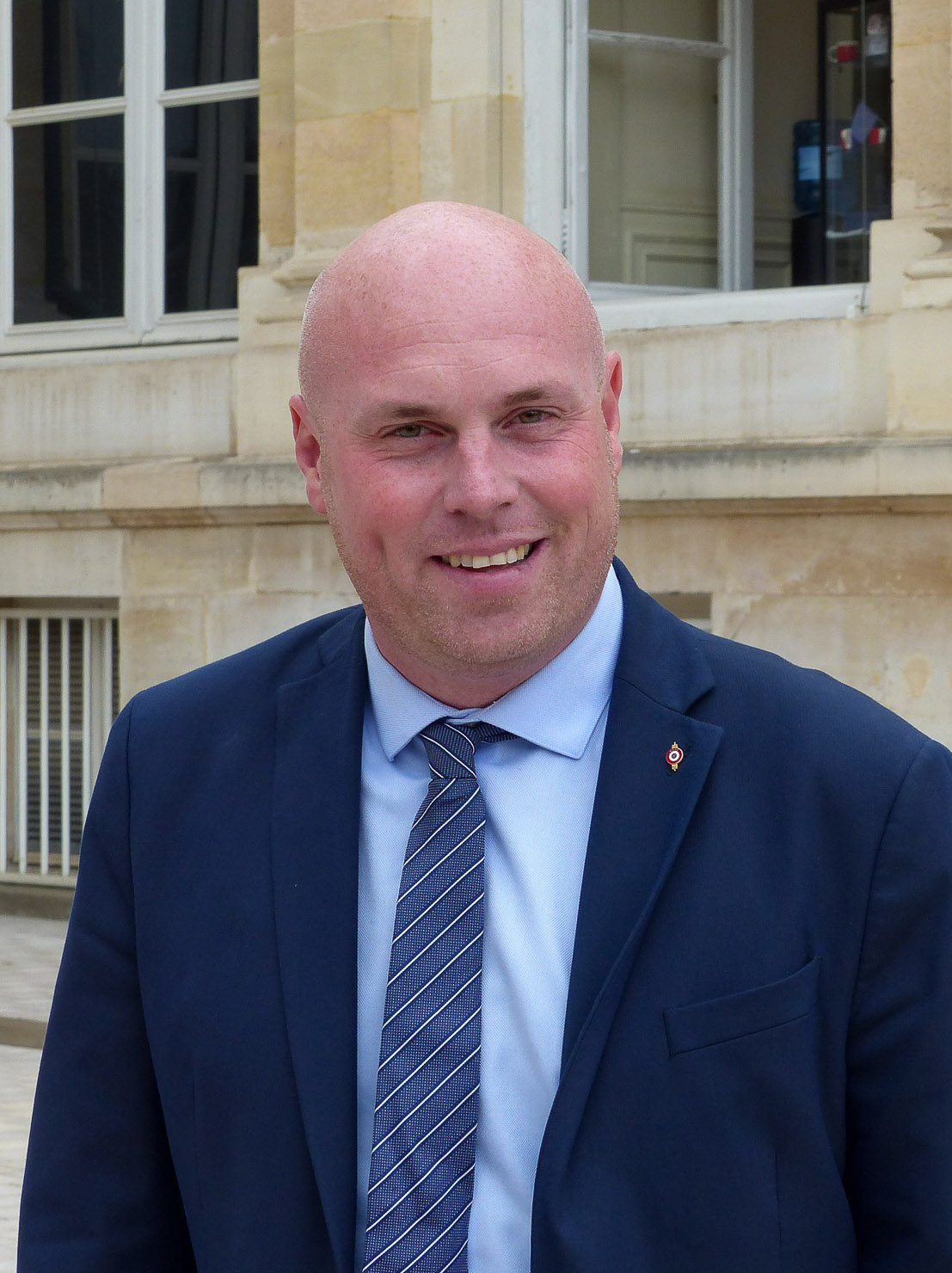

Member of the French National Assembly for Nord's 13th constituency
- Incumbent
- Assumed office 18 July 2024
- Preceded by: Christine Decodts

Personal details
- Born: 13 March 1983
- Political party: Socialist Party

Julien Gokel (born 13 March 1983) is a French politician of the Socialist Party who was elected member of the National Assembly for Nord's 13th constituency in 2024. He has served as mayor of Cappelle-la-Grande since 2020, and is vice president of the Communauté urbaine de Dunkerque and a member of the Departmental Council of Nord. In the 2024 legislative election he ran as a dissident candidate of the New Popular Front.
