= Jean Le Garrec =

French politician (1929–2023)

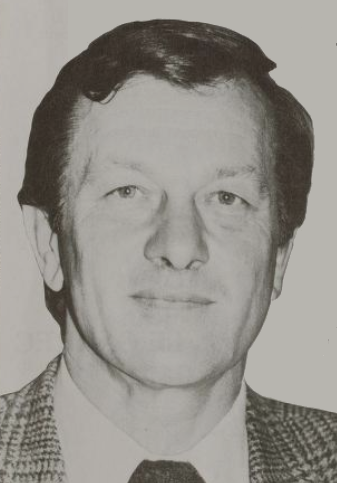
- Le Garrec in 1981

Deputy of the French National Assembly
- In office 12 June 1997 – 19 June 2007
- Preceded by: Régis Fauchoit
- Succeeded by: Christian Hutin
- Constituency: Nord's 12th constituency
- In office 2 August 1986 – 1 April 1993
- Preceded by: none
- Succeeded by: Claude Pringalle
- Constituency: Proportional representation (1986–1988); Nord's 18th constituency (1988–1993)

President of the Commission for Cultural, Family and Social Affairs in the National Assembly
- In office 8 April 1998 – 18 June 2002
- Preceded by: Claude Bartolone
- Succeeded by: Jean-Michel Dubernard

President of the Finance Committee of the National Assembly
- In office 7 April 1992 – 1 April 1993
- Preceded by: Henri Emmanuelli
- Succeeded by: Jacques Barrot

Secretary of State for the Civil Service and Administrative Simplifications
- In office 23 July 1984 – 20 March 1986
- Preceded by: Anicet Le Pors
- Succeeded by: Hervé de Charette

Minister Delegate for Employment
- In office 29 June 1982 – 22 March 1983
- Preceded by: Georges Gorse (indirectly)
- Succeeded by: Jack Ralite

Personal details
- Born: 9 August 1929 Le Palais, France
- Died: 19 February 2023 (aged 93)
- Party: PSU (until 1974); PS (since 1974)
- Occupation: Businessman

Jean Le Garrec (9 August 1929 – 19 February 2023) was a French businessman and politician of the Socialist Party (PS).

== Biography ==
Born in Le Palais on 9 August 1929, Le Garrec was initially a member of the Unified Socialist Party. In 1974, he followed Michel Rocard to the PS. In 1981, he was elected to the National Assembly in Nord's 16th constituency. On 23 June 1981, he was appointed Secretary of State in Charge of Nationalizations. He served as Minister Delegate for Employment from 1984 to 1986. He was elected again to the National Assembly in 1986 for the Nord department via proportional representation. He was re-elected in 1988 to represent Nord's 18th constituency. He lost his mandate in 1993 but returned in 1997 in Nord's 12th constituency. He was re-elected in 2002.

In addition to his legislative career, Le Garrec participated in the Club Réformer, a political think tank, alongside Martine Aubry, Marylise Lebranchu, François Lamy, and Adeline Hazan. In 2006, he announced he would not stand for re-election the following year. He was succeeded by Christian Hutin.

Jean Le Garrec died on 19 February 2023, at the age of 93.

== Distinctions ==
- Knight of the Legion of Honour (2011)

== Publications ==
- Une vie à gauche (2006)
- Trois femmes (2011)
