= Saint-Pol-sur-Mer =

- Associated commune of Dunkerque
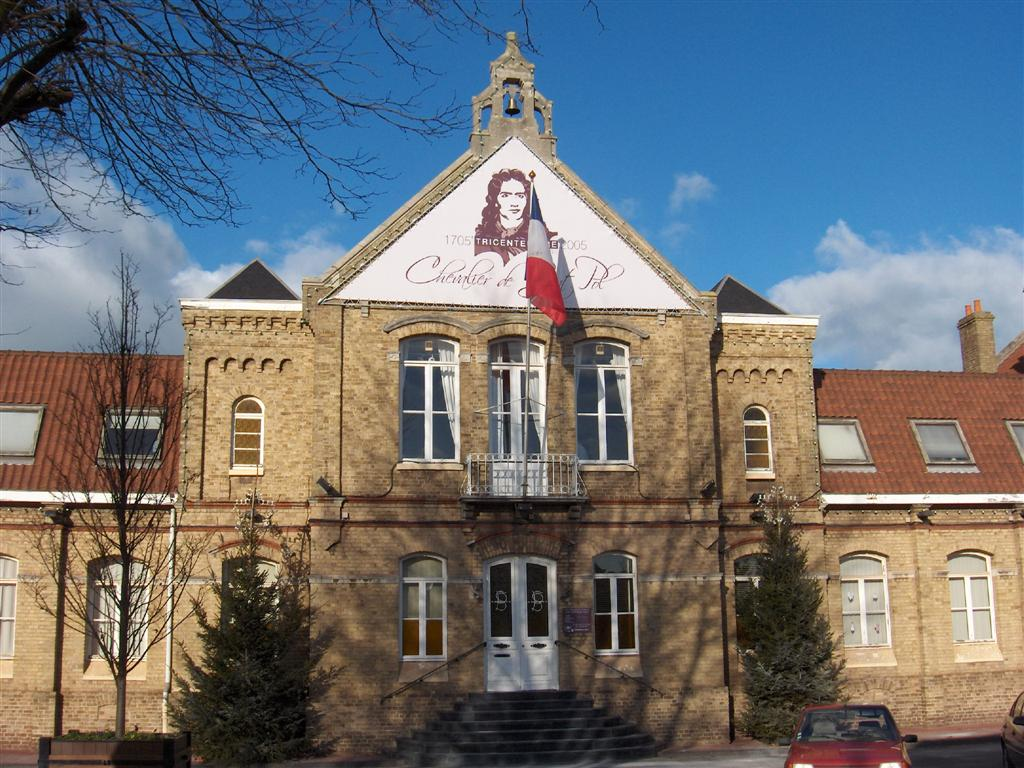
- Former town hall of Saint-Pol-sur-Mer

- Flag Coat of arms
- Location of Saint-Pol-sur-Mer
- Location within France Location within Hauts-de-France
- Coordinates: 51.0314°N 2.3439°E
- Country: France
- Region: Hauts-de-France
- Department: Nord
- Arrondissement: Dunkerque
- Canton: Dunkerque-1
- Commune: Dunkerque
- Area^{1}: 5.14 km^{2} (1.98 sq mi)
- Population (2022): 20,346
  - Density: 3,960/km^{2} (10,300/sq mi)
- Time zone: UTC+01:00 (CET)
  - Summer (DST): UTC+02:00 (CEST)
- Postal code: 59430
- Website: https://www.ville-saintpolsurmer.fr/
- ^{1} French Land Register data, which excludes lakes, ponds, glaciers > 1 km^{2} (0.386 sq mi or 247 acres) and river estuaries.

Saint-Pol-sur-Mer (French pronunciation: [sɛ̃ pɔl syʁ mɛʁ], literally Saint-Pol on Sea; West Flemish: Sint-Pols; Picard: Saint-Po-dsu-Mér) is a former commune in the Nord department in northern France. Since 9 December 2010, it is part of the commune of Dunkirk. In 2022 it had 20,346 inhabitants. It is the second-largest suburb of the city of Dunkirk, and is almost encircled by it.

The commune was created in 1877, by its territory being detached from Petite-Synthe.

== Personalities ==
- Yannick Kamanan, footballer
- Kristina Mladenovic, tennis player
- Jérémy Patinier, journalist
- José-Karl Pierre-Fanfan, footballer

== Heraldry ==
Arms of Saint-Pol-sur-Mer	The arms of Saint-Pol-sur-Mer are blazoned : Per saltire Or and vert, a saltire indented sable, between a lion sable, armed and langued gules, 2 lions crowned Or, and a lyre gules.
