= François-Xavier Villain =

French politician (1950–2025)

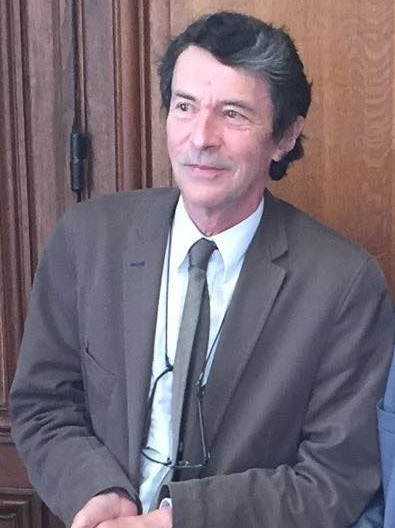
- Villain in 2020

Mayor of Cambrai
- In office 18 October 1992 – 27 April 2025
- Preceded by: Jacques Legendre

Member of the National Assembly for Nord's 18th constituency
- In office 19 June 2002 – 21 June 2017
- Preceded by: Brigitte Douay
- Succeeded by: Guy Bricout

Personal details
- Born: 31 May 1950 Abbeville, France
- Died: 27 April 2025 (aged 74) Cambrai, France
- Party: Debout la France; UDI
- Education: Sciences Po

François-Xavier Villain (31 May 1950 – 27 April 2025) was a French politician who was a member of the National Assembly of France. He represented the Nord department, from 2002 to 2017 and was a member of Arise the Republic, a small Gaullist party led by Nicolas Dupont-Aignan. He was also mayor of Cambrai.

== Professional career ==
Villain graduated from the Institut d'études politiques de Paris in 1972, and was admitted to the Cambrai bar the same year, at just 22 years of age, making him the youngest lawyer in France.

== Political career ==
=== Political debut ===
Immersed in the world of politics by his father, François-Yves Villain, a Gaullist activist, he became involved in local politics at an early age, and it was under Jacques Legendre's mandate that he was first elected town councillor in 1977, then deputy mayor in charge of personnel in 1983.

At the same time, François-Xavier Villain was elected general councillor for the canton of Cambrai-Ouest in 1982, a position he held until 2002. From March 1992 to March 1998, he was vice-president of the Conseil Général du Nord. He also chaired the council's decentralization and human resources commission from 1994 to 1998.

=== Mayor of Cambrai ===
Elected mayor of Cambrai on 18 October 1992, following the resignation of Jacques Legendre, who was affected by the accumulation of mandates following his election to the Senate, Villain was re-elected in the first round in 1995 with 67.3% of the vote, and in 2001 with 63.9%.

As mayor, he was instrumental in setting up neighborhood meetings in 1993, as well as the Handimômes scheme to support parents of disabled children.

His list won the first round of the 2008 municipal elections with 66.2% of the vote. In December of the same year, he was elected chairman of the Cambrai urban community following the resignation of Jacques Legendre.

With the redistribution of France's armed forces having led to the closure of the 103 Cambrai-Épinoy air base, Villain obtained government approval for the entire arrondissement to be classified as a revitalization zone (tax assistance for business start-ups) and for the Ministry of Defense's accounting and financial analysis center to be set up in Cambrai. This project was eventually abandoned. Accompanied by Guy Bricout, mayor of Caudry, Villain presented an initial project in 2012 to convert the air base into a Mobilopolis mobility theme park. In the end, it was the project for a logistics platform specialized in e-commerce, christened E-Valley, that saw the light of day. The site, sold for a symbolic one euro to the Cambrai agglomeration community and the Osartis Marquion community of municipalities, is Europe's largest logistics park, with 750,000 m^{2} of warehouse space and 1,300 jobs created. It was inaugurated by Villain, in the presence of Xavier Bertrand, President of the Hauts-de-France regional council, on 11 May 2021.

Villain was re-elected as Cambrai mayor in the 2014 municipal elections. His "Union pour Cambrai" list was elected with 72.5% of the vote in the first round, winning a majority of 35 seats out of 39 on the municipal council, enabling him to be re-elected mayor on 29 March 2014. Shortly afterwards, he was re-elected president of the Cambrai agglomeration community (CAC).

On 2 January 2017, Villain was re-elected to the presidency of the Communauté d'Agglomération de Cambrai following its merger with the Communauté de Communes de la Vacquerie.

In August 2019, he announced his candidacy for the 2020 municipal elections in Cambrai. His list wins in the first round with 56.3% of the vote against six other lists. He was re-elected mayor by the municipal council on 24 May 2020. On 15 July he ran for the presidency of the CAC, winning by a narrow margin over dissident Marjorie Gosselet (48 votes to 44). At the same time, he withdrew the delegations of three vice-presidents supported by Gosselet. The following year, he resigned from the presidency of the intermunicipality.

On 7 September 2022, he announced that he was temporarily withdrawing from Cambrai town council affairs for health reasons, with his first deputy acting as interim mayor. He resumed his activities at the end of 2022.

=== Member of Parliament for Nord ===
Villain joined forces with Guy Bricout, mayor of Caudry, the second largest town in the eighteenth Nord constituency, with whom he won the 2002 and 2007 legislative elections. Under the slogan "La passion du territoire", this same pair was re-elected for a further term in 2012. Throughout his term of office, he was one of the least active members of the French National Assembly, making no appearances in the Chamber between 2002 and 2006. He defended himself by saying: "Just because you don't come to Paris doesn't mean you're a bad MP", preferring to describe himself as a "regional facilitator", particularly in economic terms.

== Decorations ==
Villain was appointed to the rank of Knight in the Order of Academic Palms. On 21 November 1995, he was appointed to the rank of Knight in the National Order of Merit as "Vice-President of the General Council of Nord, Mayor of Cambrai; 23 years of professional activities, military service, and elected positions."

== Death ==
Villain died on 27 April 2025, at the age of 74.
