= Departmental Council of Nord =

Departmental legislature in France

Departmental Council of Nord Conseil départemental du Nord
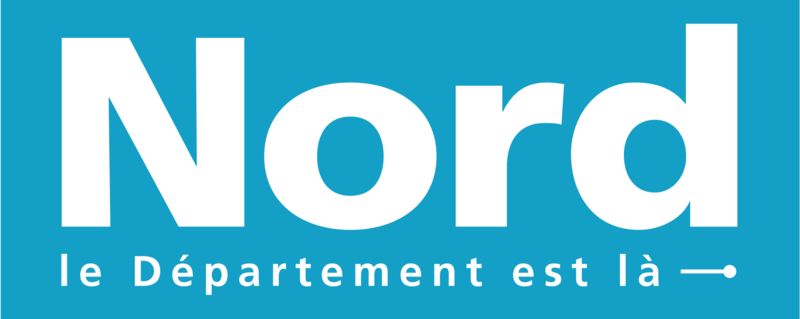
- Established: 4 March 1791

Leadership
- President: Christian Poiret, DVD since 1 July 2021

Meeting place
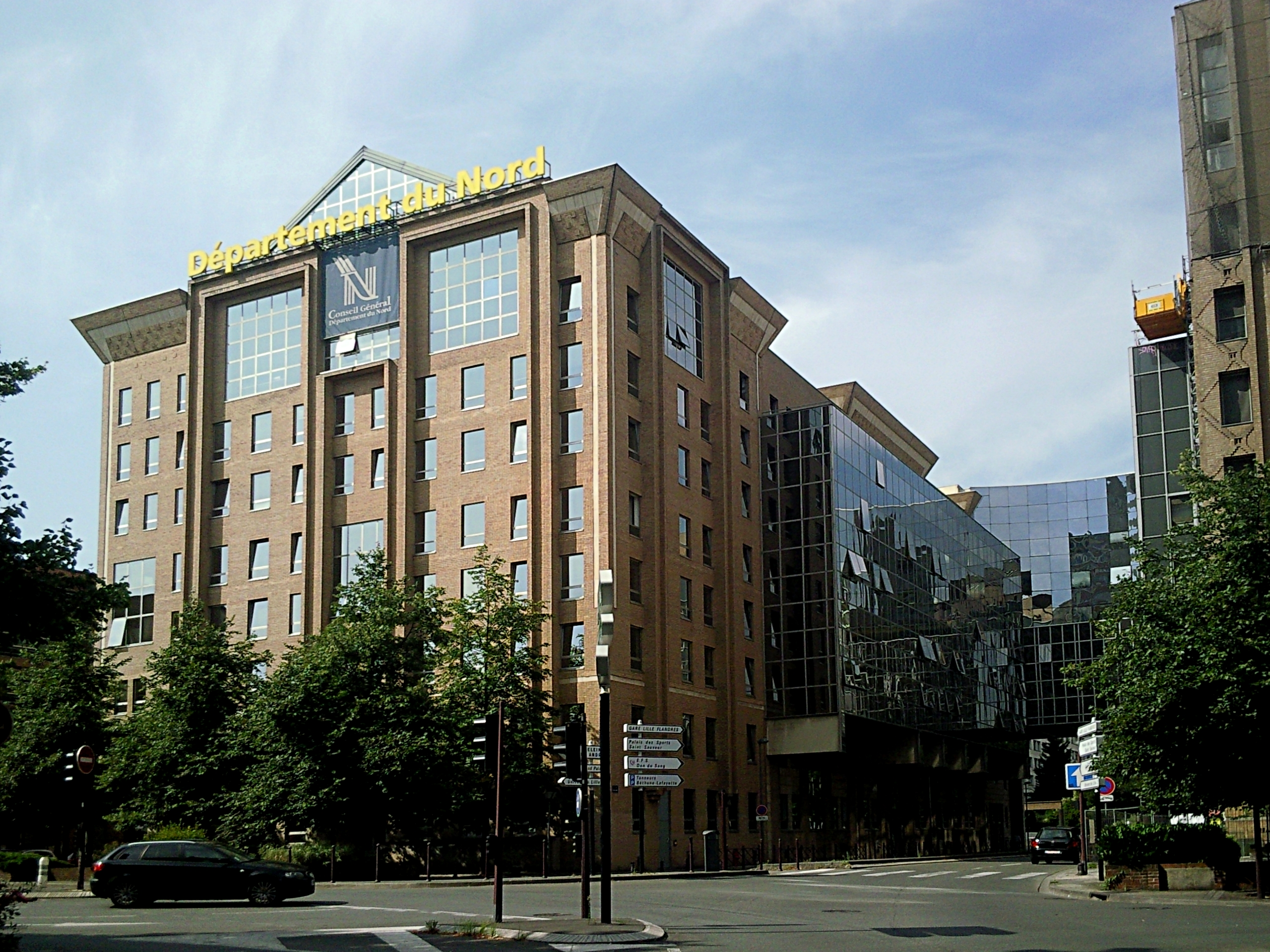
- 51 Rue Gustave Delory, 59047 Lille

Website
- lenord.fr

The Departmental Council of Nord (French: Conseil départemental du Nord, Picard: Consièl départémintal dech Nord) is the deliberative assembly of the French department of the Nord, the most populous French department. The headquarters of this decentralized local authority are in Lille.

== History ==
Pursuant to a decree of the Constituent Assembly of December 22, 1790, the province of Flanders officially became the Department of Nord on March 4, 1791, with Douai as its capital.

The first president of the general council was Louis Joseph de Warenghien de Flory, magistrate and politician in Douai. When it was created, the Nord had 8 arrondissements: Avesnes (now part of Avesnes-sur-Helpe), Bergues (now part of Dunkirk), Cambrai, Douai, Hazebrouck (now part of Dunkirk), Lille, Le Quesnoy (now part of Avesnes-sur-Helpe) and Valenciennes.

In 1803, the prefect, who then presided over the general council, changed the seat of the council to Lille, the former capital of the province of Flanders, in Hôtel de Roquefeuille, rue Française (now rue Négrier, in Old Lille). However, the premises turned out to be unsuitable and the prefecture was established in 1826 in a large building on rue Royale (today the Bishop's Palace).

From 1860, with the development of the administrative powers and competences of the prefects, the Hôtel de la rue Royale became 'too cramped'. In 1862, the Lille municipality offered a large piece of land, outside the old ramparts, on the still free plots which separated Lille from the municipality of Wazemmes.

On August 15, 1865, Prefect Henri-Alexandre Wallon laid the first stone of the new building on Place Napoléon III, now Place de la République, on the occasion of the Emperor's Day. A lead box enclosed in this stone contains the minutes of the operation and coins of the time bearing the effigy of the Emperor.

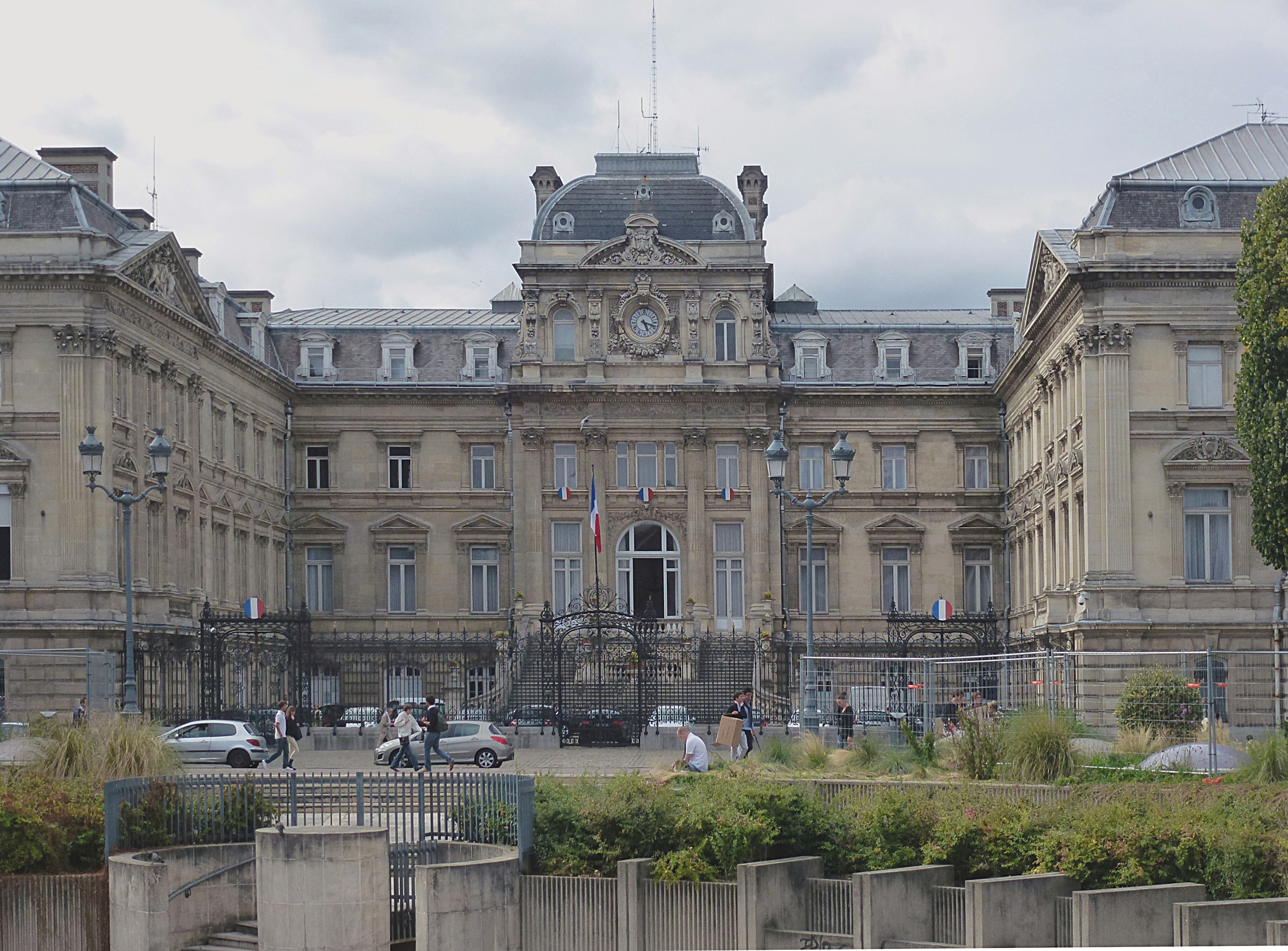
Hôtel de la Préfecture du Nord, built in 1872

Throughout the work, many changes were made to the project. Construction took place over several years and it was in 1872 that the Hôtel de la Préfecture was completed and the General Council sat there for the first time.

In 1920, due to the growing development of the departmental administration, the problem of the small size of the premises arose again. In 1932, part of the services of the General Council was annexed to the corner of Boulevard de la Liberté and Rue Baptiste-Monnoyer.

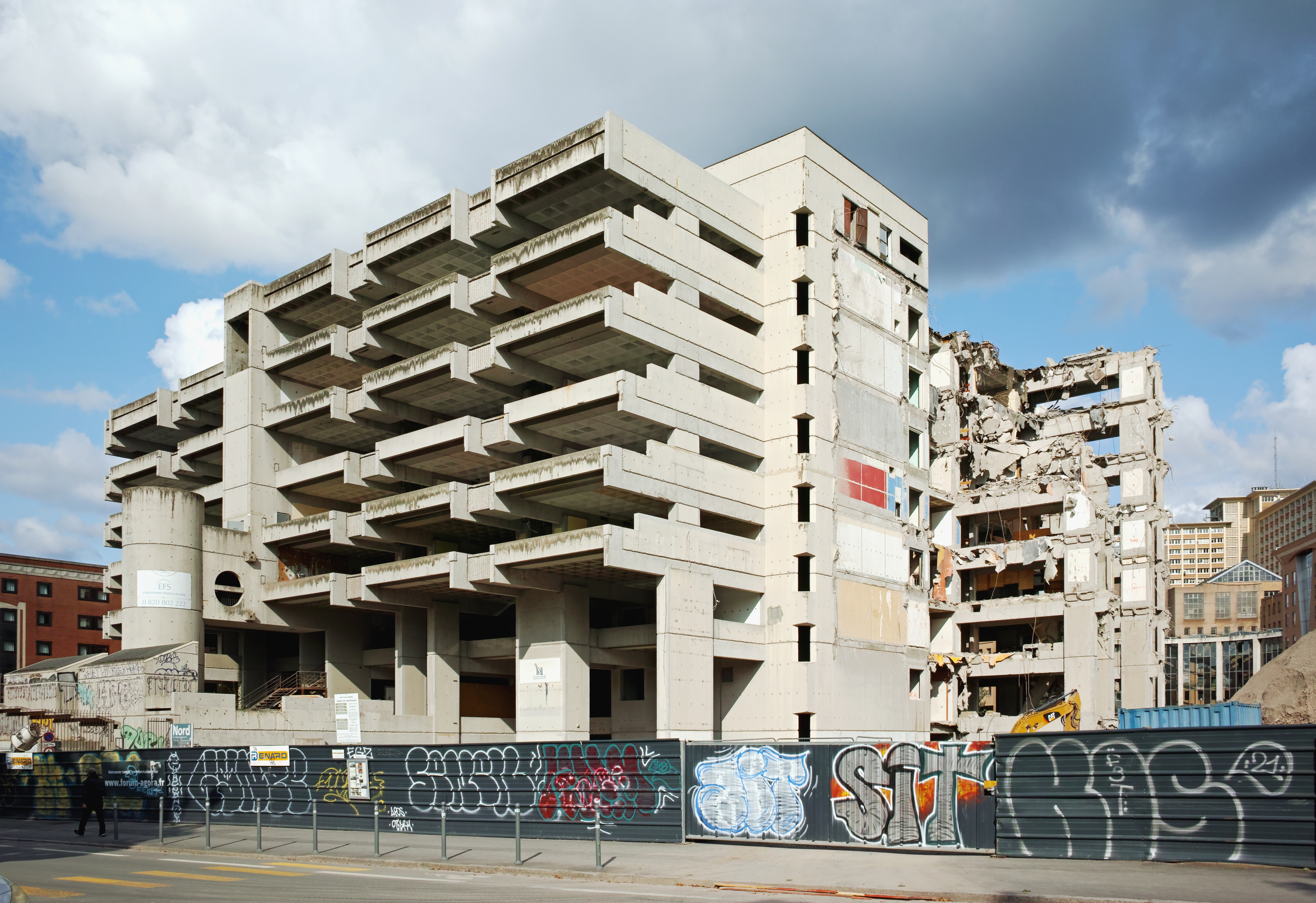
The Forum being demolished

In the early 1970s, a new building, the Forum, was built at the corner of Charles Saint-Venant and Gustave Delory streets. Until 2019, it housed part of the department's central services. Dilapidated, it was demolished in 2021. A reconstruction project is underway on the site.

The latter was raised on rue Gustave-Delory in 1982, in the wake of' the first decentralization laws which entrusted the administration of the general council to an elected president.

In 2015, the cantons went from 8 to 6: Avesnes-sur-Helpe, Cambrai, Douai, Dunkirque, Lille and Valenciennes.

The building on the Place de la République, which still belongs to the Nord department today, houses the residence of the prefect of the Nord as well as his services. It still hosts meetings of the departmental council in its former hemicycle.

== Composition ==
=== The President ===
The departmental council of Nord has been chaired since July 1, 2021 by Christian Poiret (DVD), who succeeds Jean-René Lecerf (DVD), following the departmental elections of 2021.

=== Vice-Presidents ===
The executive of the Departmental Council of Nord is made up of 15 vice-presidents and 4 delegated councilors.

List of vice-presidents
Order	Name	Delegation(s)
1st	Doriane Becue	Employment and integration
2nd	Max-André Pick	Finance and General Affairs
3rd	Jean-Luc Detavernier	Human resources
4th	Patrick Valois	Rurality and environment
5th	Nicolas Siegler	Regional planning and Seine-Nord Europe Canal
6th	Marie Tonnerre	Childhood, family and youth
7th	Sylvie Clerc	Disability
8th	Frédérique Seels	Autonomy of the elderly
9th	Valentin Belleval	Roads and infrastructure
10th	Jean-Noel Verfaillie	Housing, urban renewal and city policy
11th	Martine Alrabosse	Culture and institutional communication
12th	Marie Cieters	Colleges and education
13th	Barbara Coëvoët	Health and prevention
14th	Mickaël Hiraux	Renewal of territories
15th	Loïc Cathelain	Tourism and mobility

=== Political composition ===
Since 2015, the departmental council has 82 departmental councillors, elected in joint pairs from each of the 41 cantons of Nord.

Composition (by party)
Party	Acronym	Seats
Majority (50 seats)
Union of the Right	UD	30
Miscellaneous right	DVD	10
Union of the Centre and the Right	UCD	8
Miscellaneous centre	DVC	2
Opposition (32 seats)
Union of the Left	UG	18
French Communist Party	PCF	4
Miscellaneous left	DVG	4
Union of the Left and Ecologists	UGE	4
Europe Ecology – The Greens	EELV	2
