= Brigitte Douay =

French politician

Member of the National Assembly for Nord's 18th constituency
- In office 12 June 1997 – 19 June 2002
- Preceded by: Claude Pringalle
- Succeeded by: François-Xavier Villain

Personal details
- Born: 24 February 1947 (age 79) Paris, France
- Party: Socialist Party
- Education: Sciences Po

Brigitte Douay (born 24 February 1947 in Paris) is a French politician and Member of the European Parliament for the north-west of France. She is a member of the Socialist Party, which is part of the Party of European Socialists, and sits on the Committee on Budgets.

She is also a substitute for the Committee on Regional Development, a member of the delegation for relations with Japan, and a substitute for the delegation to the EU–Mexico Joint Parliamentary Committee.

== Career ==
- Degree in classics (1968), graduate of Sciences Po
- Teacher (1971)
- Editorial secretary on 30 jours d'Europe (1971–1972)
- Editorial secretary on issues of the Moniteur devoted to public works (1972–1973)
- Journalist (1974–1977)
- Press attaché to Pierre Mauroy, Mayor of Lille and Chairman of the Nord-Pas-de-Calais region (1977–1981)
- Press attaché in the office of Pierre Mauroy, Prime Minister (1981–1984)
- Press and parliamentary attaché in the office of the State Secretary for the Civil Service (1984–1986)
- Responsible for external relations at the Commission for the National Plan (1986–1988)
- Responsible for public relations, Nord-Pas-de-Calais region (1988–1993)
- Responsible for public relations at Lille Grand Palais (congress centre) (1993–1997)
- Director of communications, Jean-Jaurès Foundation (2003–2004)
- Member of Cambrai Municipal Council (2001–2004)
- Member of the Nord-Pas-de-Calais Regional Council (since 2004)
- Member of the National Assembly for Nord (1997–2002)
- Chairwoman of the national anti-counterfeiting committee (1997–2002)
