= Doriane Bécue =

French politician (born 1985)

Mayor of Tourcoing
- Incumbent
- Assumed office 13 September 2020
- Preceded by: Gérald Darmanin

Personal details
- Born: 30 October 1985 (age 40)
- Party: Independent

Doriane Bécue (born 30 October 1985) is a French politician serving as mayor of Tourcoing since 2020. She is a member of the Departmental Council of Nord and has served as its 1st vice president since 2021.
