= Mouvaux =

- Commune
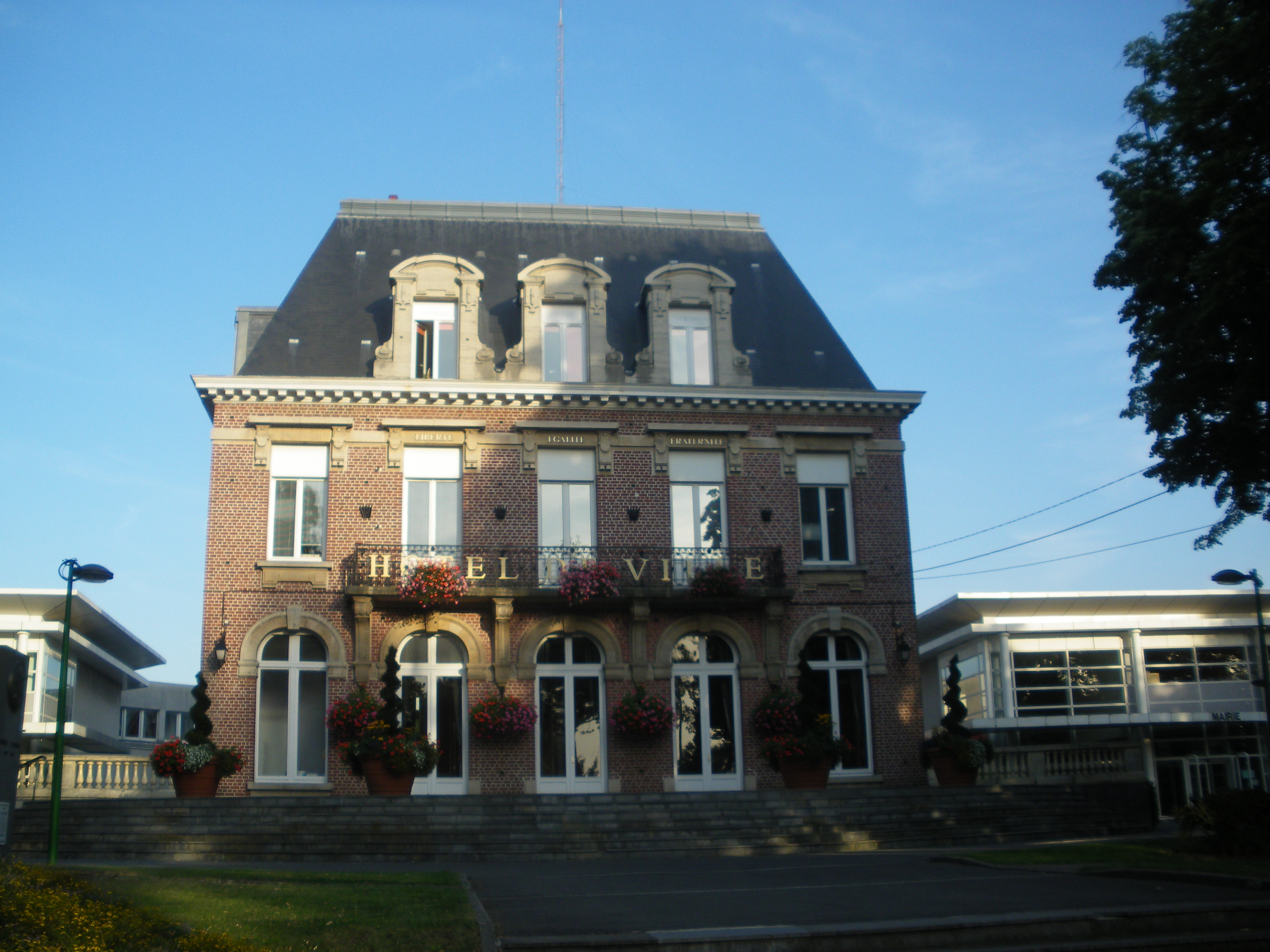
- The town hall in Mouvaux

- Coat of arms
- Location of Mouvaux
- Location within France Location within Hauts-de-France
- Coordinates: 50°42′14″N 3°08′29″E
- Country: France
- Region: Hauts-de-France
- Department: Nord
- Arrondissement: Lille
- Canton: Lille-2
- Intercommunality: Métropole Européenne de Lille

Government
  - Mayor (2020–2026): Éric Durand
- Area^{1}: 4.17 km^{2} (1.61 sq mi)
- Elevation: 53 m (174 ft)
- Highest elevation: 57 m (187 ft)
- Lowest elevation: 28 m (92 ft)
- Population (2023): 13,369
  - Density: 3,210/km^{2} (8,300/sq mi)
- Time zone: UTC+01:00 (CET)
  - Summer (DST): UTC+02:00 (CEST)
- INSEE/Postal code: 59421 /59420
- ^{1} French Land Register data, which excludes lakes, ponds, glaciers > 1 km^{2} (0.386 sq mi or 247 acres) and river estuaries.

Mouvaux (French pronunciation: [muvo]; Dutch: Mouvouw) is a commune in the Nord department in northern France. It is part of the Métropole Européenne de Lille.

== Population ==
Historical population
Year	Pop.	±% p.a.
1968	11,247	—
1975	10,724	−0.68%
1982	12,631	+2.37%
1990	13,566	+0.90%
1999	13,177	−0.32%
2007	13,013	−0.16%
2012	13,628	+0.93%
2017	13,151	−0.71%
2023	13,369	+0.27%
Source: INSEE

== Heraldry ==
Arms of Mouvaux	The arms of Mouvaux are blazoned : Or, fretty azure.

== Twin towns – sister cities ==
Mouvaux is twinned with:

- Buckingham, England, United Kingdom
- Halle, Belgium
- Neukirchen-Vluyn, Germany

== See also ==
- Communes of the Nord department
