= Hôtel de Ville, Tourcoing =

Town hall in Tourcoing, France

Hôtel de Ville
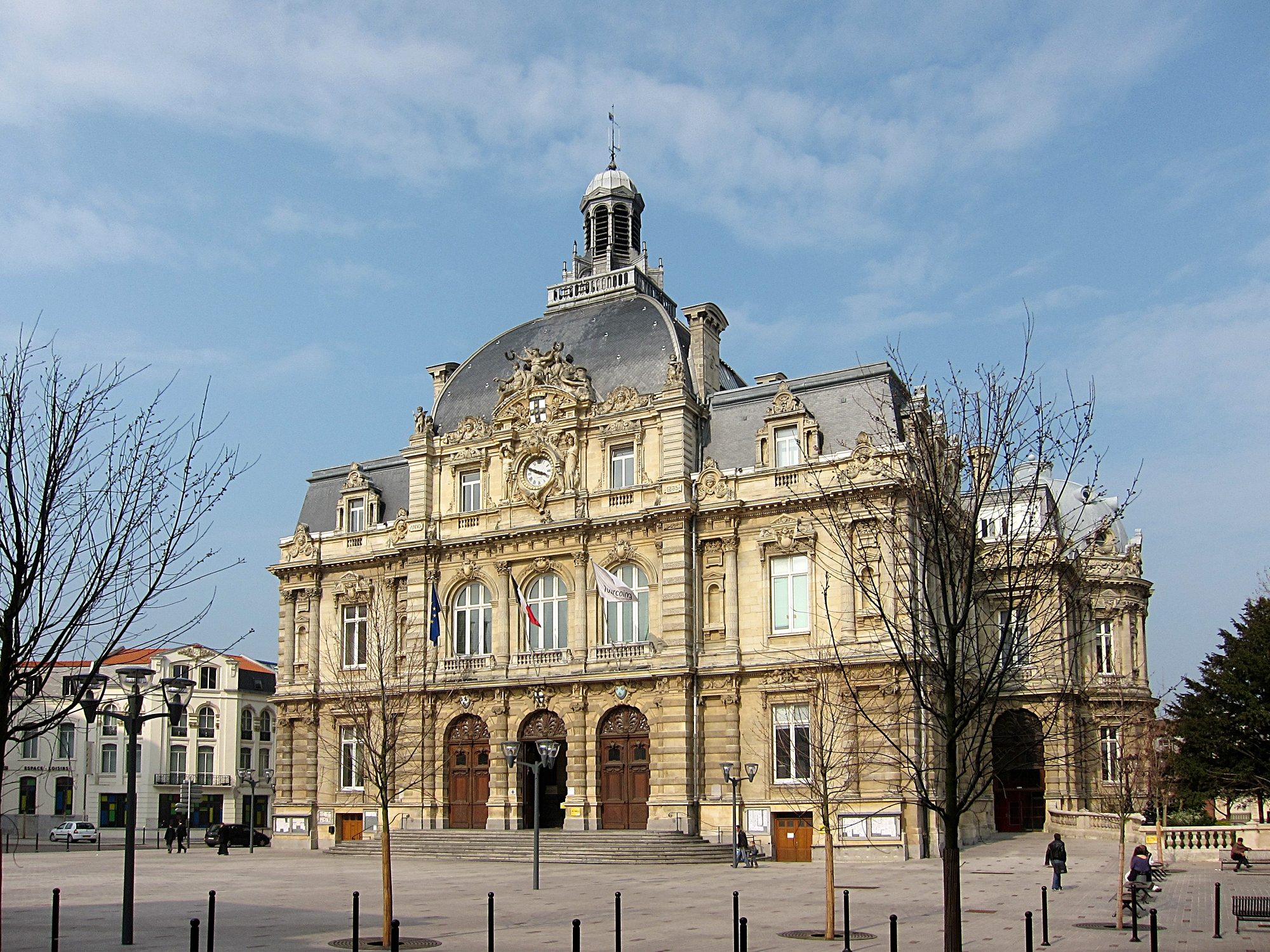
- Main frontage of the Hôtel de Ville in March 2011

General information
- Type: City hall
- Architectural style: Second Empire style
- Location: Tourcoing, France
- Coordinates: 50.7240°N 3.1610°E
- Completed: 1885

Design and construction
- Architect: Charles Maillard

Monument historique
- Official name: Hôtel de ville
- Type: Inscrit
- Designated: 1981
- Reference no.: PA00107840

The Hôtel de Ville (French pronunciation: [otɛl də vil], City Hall) is a historic building in Tourcoing, Nord, northern France, standing on the Rue Paul Doumer. It was designated a monument historique by the French government in 1981.

== History ==
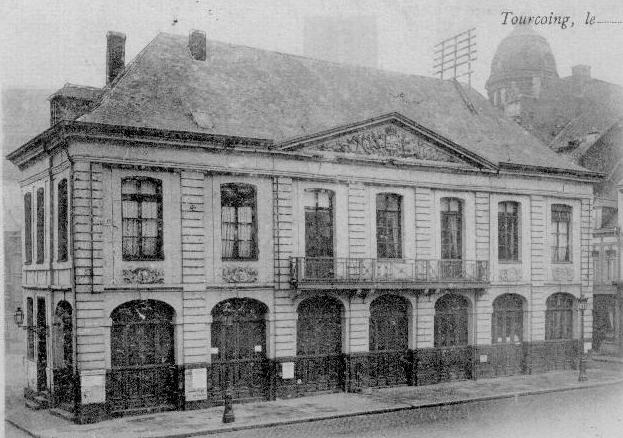
The Hôtel de Ville of 1718

The first meeting place of the aldermen of Tourcoing was a market hall completed in 1505. In the early 18th century, the council decided to erect a dedicated town hall on the Grand Place. A new building was designed by François-Joseph Gombert, built in stone, completed in 1718, and extended in 1823. Although there was limited violence in the town during the July Revolution in 1830, revolutionaries instructed the mayor to remove the Royal coat of arms from the pediment on the building.

In the mid-19th century, the council, led by the mayor, Louis Wattinne, decided to commission a new building. The site they selected caused some controversy because it was on a relatively minor street, now known as Place Victor Hassebroucq, rather than on the Grand Place. The foundation stone for the new building was laid on 15 August 1866, but there were delays, due to the shortage of labour caused by the Franco-Prussian War. The building was designed by Charles Maillard in the Second Empire style, built in ashlar stone and was completed in 1885.

The design involved a symmetrical main frontage of five bays facing onto Rue Condorcet (later renamed Rue Paul Doumer). The central section of three bays, which was slightly projected forward, featured three round headed doorways with voussoirs and keystones on the ground floor, three round headed windows with archivolts, keystones and balustrades on the first floor, and a clock flanked by a pair of sash windows on the second floor. The outer bays were fenestrated by sash windows with cornices on the ground and first floors and by dormer windows on the second floor. The bays on the ground floor were flanked by Ionic order columns supporting a frieze and a cornice, while the bays on the second floor were flanked by Corinthian order columns supporting an entablature and a parapet. The clock was flanked by a pair of statues supporting a segmental pediment with fine carvings. The statues were created by the sculptor, Félix Huidiez, and were intended to represent industry and cornucopia. At roof level, there was a dome with belfry surmounted by a weather vane.

Following Maillard's death in December 1875, the works on the interior decoration continued for almost another four decades under the direction of another architect, Louis Le Ban, and were only completed in 1912. The principal room was the council chamber on the first floor: the frescos in that room were the work of Gustave Adolphe Grau.

After Tourcoing was occupied by German military forces at the start of the First World War, there was considerable resistance from local civilians. Although civilians were required by the Germans to surrender weapons at municipal buildings, the Germans were shocked to find an extensive arms depot in the town hall in 1916. The mayor, Louis Vandevenne, was arrested and imprisoned in Germany. At the end of the war, the deprivations suffered by French civilians, the atrocities they endured and their actions in refusing to work for the Germans, were recognised during speeches delivered in the town hall by the prime minister Georges Clemenceau on 19 October 1918, and by the president Raymond Poincaré on 21 October 1918.

== Sources ==
- Ameye, Jacques (1963). La vie politique à Tourcoing sous la Troisième République. FeniXX rédition numérique.
- Connolly, James (2012). "Encountering Germans: the Experience of Occupation in the Nord, 1914–1918" (PDF). King's College London. p. 162.
- Lottin, Alain (1986). Histoire de Tourcoing. Presses Universitaires du Septentrion. ISBN 978-2903077662.
