= Christian Hutin =

French politician

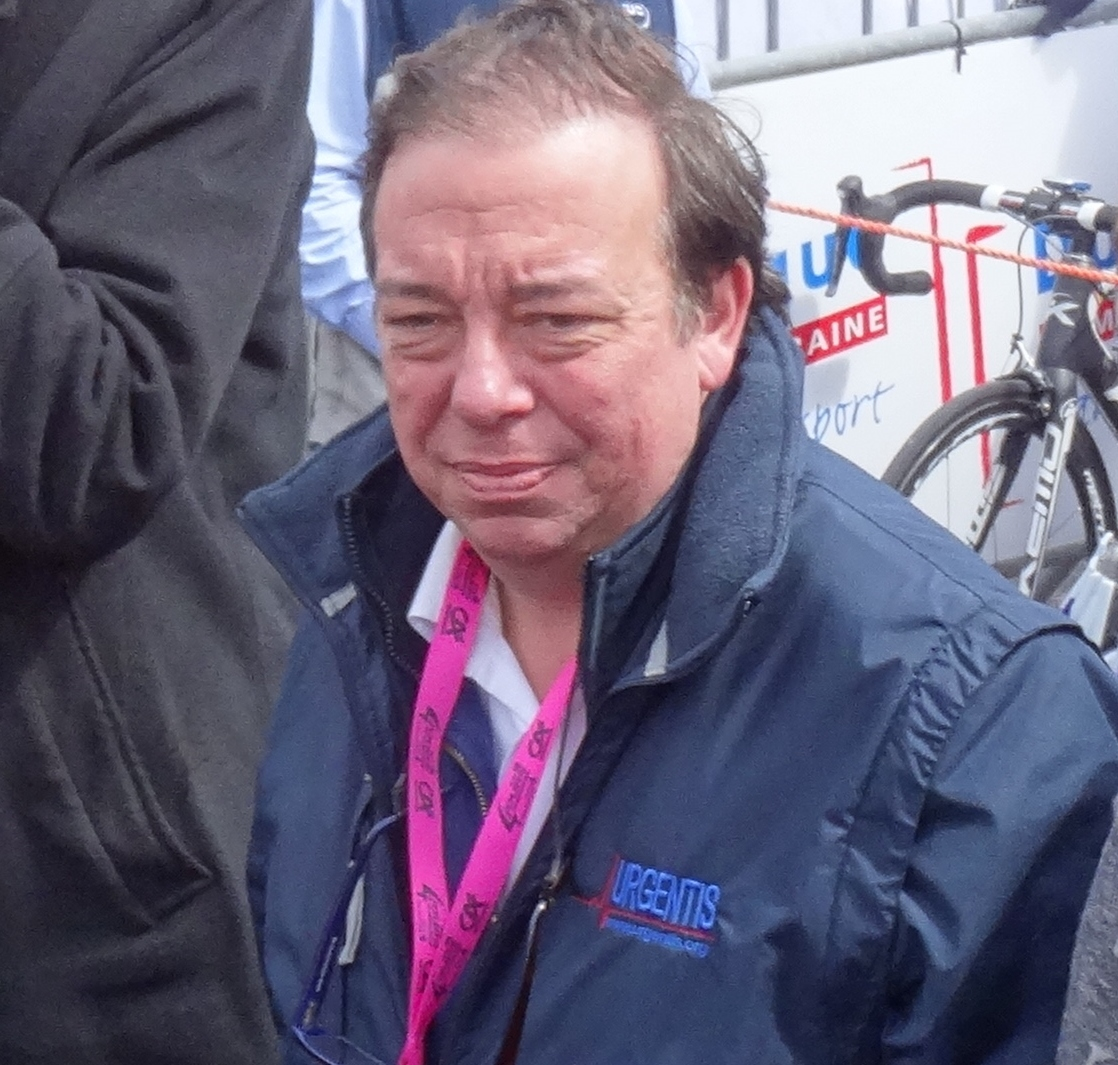

MP for Nord's 13th constituency

Christian Hutin (born 18 January 1961 in Lille, Nord) is a French politician and member of the National Assembly of France. He represents the Nord department as the Member of Parliament for Nord's 13th constituency, and is a member of the Citizen and Republican Movement.

Elected mayor of Saint-Pol-sur-Mer in 1995 as part of the Rassemblement pour la République, he joined the Mouvement des Citoyens in 1999. He supported Jean-Pierre Chevènement in the 2002 presidential election and joined the Pôle républicain.

Vice President of the Urban Community of Dunkirk, he became a regional councillor in Nord-Pas-de-Calais in 2004 before being elected a député from Nord in the 2007 legislative elections, the sole MRC representative in the National Assembly.

On 9 December 2021, he announced he would not seek election in the 2022 French legislative election.

== Biography ==
Elected mayor of Saint-Pol-sur-Mer in 1995 under the banner of the Rassemblement pour la République, he joined the Mouvement des citoyens in 1999. He supported Jean-Pierre Chevènement candidacy in the 2002 presidential election and joined the Pôle républicain, then the Mouvement républicain et citoyen (MRC).

Vice-president of Communauté urbaine de Dunkerque since 1995, he became a regional councilor for Regional Council of Nord-Pas-de-Calais in 1998 before being elected deputy for the Nord department in the 2007 legislative elections. He became the only MRC representative in the National Assembly.

Although initially mentioned as sitting with the Communist group, he confirmed that he would sit with the Socialist group. In 2008, he was re-elected mayor of Saint-Pol-sur-Mer in the first round, as his list had no competition.

In 2015, during the Syrian civil war, he traveled to Syria alongside other elected officials. The trip was disapproved of by the government and the president of the National Assembly, as diplomatic relations had been severed since the Syrian regime's crimes in the spring of 2011, especially since the elected officials “made no secret of their support for Bashar al-Assad regime.” There he met Bashar al-Assad and Grand Mufti Ahmad Badreddin Hassoun.

In the June 2017 legislative elections, he won with 63% of the vote against his opponent from the National Front, candidate Philippe Eymery. He is a member of the Foreign Affairs Committee of the National Assembly (France).

He is also vice-president of the France-Ghana, France-Republic of Ireland, and France-Qatar friendship groups.

Within the Republican and Citizen Movement, he rejected the leadership's decision to align with La France Insoumise and merge with Alternative for a Republican, Ecologist, and Socialist Program. He joined the new Citizens' Movement, which was re-established on November 12, 2018.
