= Mélanie Disdier =

French politician (born 1974)

Mélanie Disdier MEP
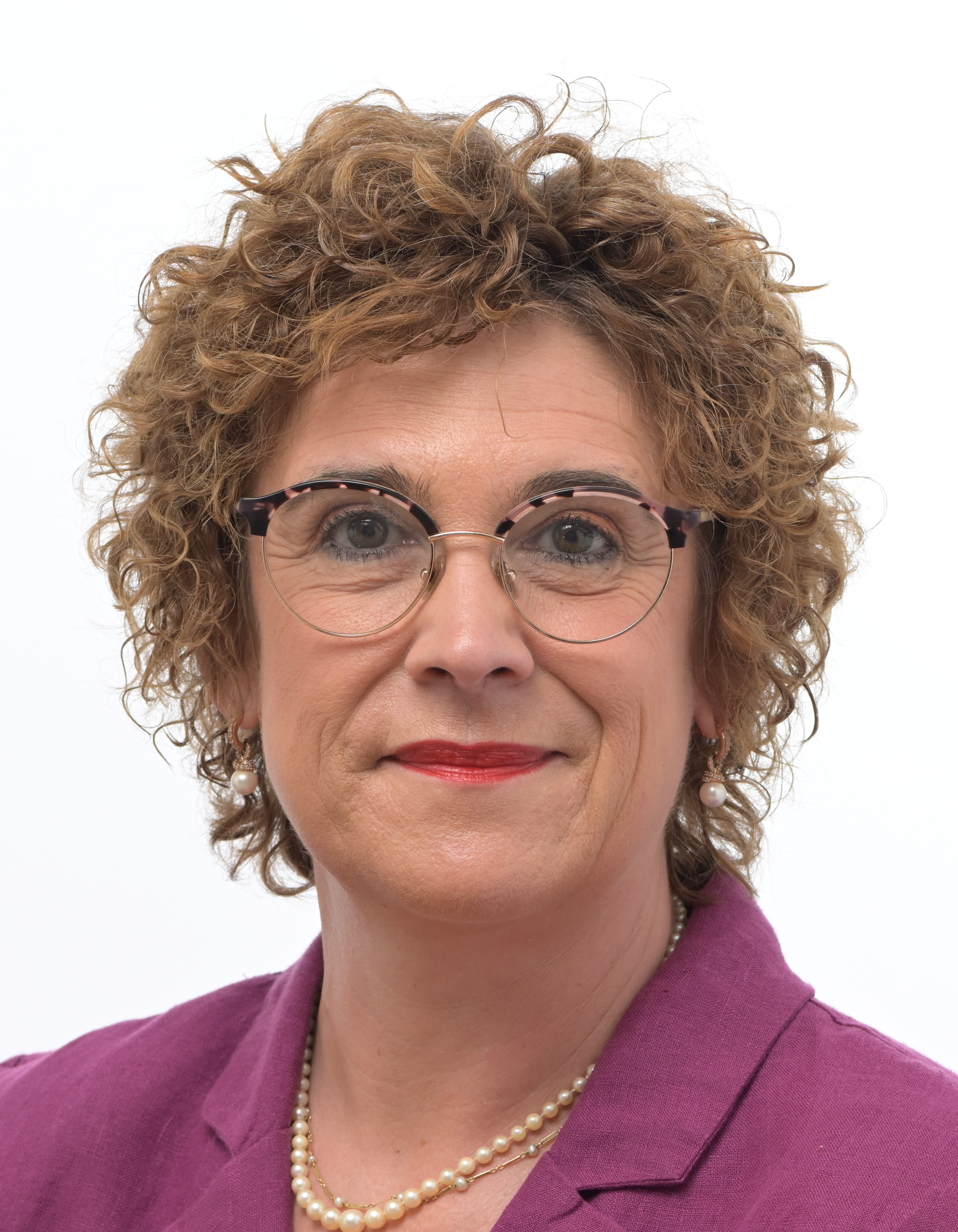
- Disdier in 2024

Member of the European Parliament for France
- Incumbent
- Assumed office 16 July 2024

Personal details
- Born: 27 January 1974 (age 52)
- Party: National Rally
- Other political affiliations: Patriots.eu

Mélanie Disdier (born 27 January 1974) is a French politician of the National Rally who was elected member of the European Parliament in 2024. She has served as a municipal councillor of Caudry since 2003, and was a member of the Regional Council of Hauts-de-France from 2004 to 2010 and from 2015 to 2024. From 2002 to 2022, she was a candidate for the National Assembly in Nord's 18th constituency in four legislative elections.
