= Nord's 18th constituency =

Constituency of the National Assembly of France

18th constituency of the Nord
- inline Constituency of the National Assembly of France

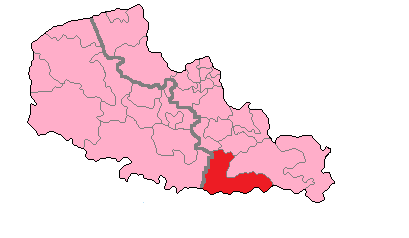
- Nord's 18th constituency shown within Nord-Pas-de-Calais
- Deputy: Alexandre Dufosset; National Rally
- Department: Nord
- Cantons: Cambrai-Est, Cambrai-Ouest, Le Cateau-Cambrésis, Clary, Marcoing
- Registered voters: 92,017

The 18th constituency of the Nord is a French legislative constituency in the Nord département.

== Description ==
Nord's 18th constituency is seated in the town on Cambrai.

Politically the seat swung between left and right during the late 20th century, it has however been held by conservatives François-Xavier Villain and Guy Bricout since 2002.

== Historic Representation ==
Election	Member	Party
1958	Ernest Denis	UNR
1962	Georges Bustin	PCF
1967	Georges Bustin	PCF
1973	Georges Bustin	PCF
1978	Georges Bustin	PCF
1981	Georges Bustin	PCF
1986	Proportional representation - no election by constituency	
1988	Jean Le Garrec	PS
1993	Claude Pringalle	RPR
1997	Brigitte Douay	PS
2002	François-Xavier Villain	DVD
2007	François-Xavier Villain	DVD
2012	François-Xavier Villain	UDI
2017	Guy Bricout	UDI
2022	Guy Bricout	UDI
2024	Alexandre Dufosset	National Rally

== Election results ==
=== 2024 ===
Legislative Election 2024: Nord's 18th constituency
Party	Candidate	Votes	%	±%
RN	Alexandre Dufosset	29,404	52.51	22.65
LFI (NFP)	Benoit Marechal	7,230	12.91	−2.44
RE (Ensemble)	Nicolas Siegler	18,434	32.92	+20.60
LO	Nadine Reynaert	930	1.66	+0.19
Turnout		55,998	97.54	+52.36
Registered electors		90,821		
RN gain from UDI				

=== 2022 ===
Legislative Election 2022: Nord's 18th constituency
Party	Candidate	Votes	%	±%
RN	Mélanie Disdier	12,074	29.86	+5.53
UDI (UDC)	Guy Bricout	8,835	21.85	-9.60
LFI (NUPÉS)	Stéphanie Maréchal	6,207	15.35	−0.07
DVC	Pierre-Antoine Villain	5,390	13.33	N/A
LREM (Ensemble)	Philippe Loyez	4,980	12.32	−13.08
REC	Gérard Philippe	1,329	3.29	N/A
PA	Aurélien Dolay	1,021	2.53	N/A
LO	Nadine Reynaert	593	1.47	N/A
Turnout		40,429	45.18	−2.01
2nd round result
UDI (UDC)	Guy Bricout	19,211	50.58	-13.09
RN	Mélanie Disdier	18,768	49.42	N/A
Turnout		37,979	44.01	+2.45
UDI hold				

=== 2017 ===
Candidate	Label	First round		Second round	
Candidate	Label	Votes	%	Votes	%
Guy Bricout	UDI	13,232	31.45	21,669	63.67
Claire Pommeyrol-Burlet	REM	10,684	25.40	12,363	36.33
Mélanie Disdier	FN	10,234	24.33		
Thérèse-Marie Cardon	FI	5,071	12.05		
Thomas Frémond	ECO	1,416	3.37		
Rosella Milot	DLF	615	1.46		
Gautier Thery	EXG	612	1.45		
Emmanuelle Larsen	DIV	197	0.47		
Joël Lamand	DVD	5	0.01		
Vincent Harduin	ECO	2	0.00		
Votes		42,068	100.00	34,032	100.00
Valid votes		42,068	97.35	34,032	89.43
Blank votes		848	1.96	2,662	6.99
Null votes		296	0.68	1,362	3.58
Turnout		43,212	47.19	38,056	41.56
Abstentions		48,363	52.81	53,516	58.44
Registered voters		91,575		91,572	
Source: Ministry of the Interior

=== 2012 ===
Legislative Election 2012: Nord's 18th constituency
Party	Candidate	Votes	%	±%
UMP	François-Xavier Villain	22,541	43.73	
PS	Martine Filleul	16,604	32.22	
FN	Samuel Lenclud	7,635	14.81	
FG	Brigitte Lefebvre	3,344	6.49	
Others	N/A	1,417		
Turnout		51,541	56.01	
2nd round result
UMP	François-Xavier Villain	28,541	57.63	
PS	Martine Filleul	20,982	42.37	
Turnout		49,523	53.82	
UMP hold				

=== 2007 ===
Legislative Election 2007: Nord's 18th constituency
Party	Candidate	Votes	%	±%
UMP	François-Xavier Villain	22,512	48.03	
PS	Brigitte Douay	11,985	25.57	
PCF	Colette Dessaint	3,016	6.43	
FN	Melanie Disdier	2,893	6.17	
MoDem	Sylvain Tranoy	2,774	5.92	
Others	N/A	3,695		
Turnout		47,857	60.22	
2nd round result
UMP	François-Xavier Villain	26,519	57.45	
PS	Brigitte Douay	19,641	42.55	
Turnout		47,745	60.08	
UMP hold				

=== 2002 ===
Legislative Election 2002: Nord's 18th constituency
Party	Candidate	Votes	%	±%
UMP	François-Xavier Villain	20,993	42.48	
PS	Brigitte Douay	14,261	28.85	
FN	Melanie Disdier	6,484	13.12	
PCF	Colette Dessaint	2,991	6.05	
CPNT	Catherine Dubois	1,066	2.16	
Others	N/A	3,629		
Turnout		50,390	64.90	
2nd round result
UMP	François-Xavier Villain	26,437	55.86	
PS	Brigitte Douay	20,888	44.14	
Turnout		49,301	63.49	
UMP gain from PS				

=== 1997 ===
Legislative Election 1997: Nord's 18th constituency
Party	Candidate	Votes	%	±%
DVD	François-Xavier Villain	16,224	30.87	
PS	Brigitte Douay	12,873	24.49	
FN	Albert Ponthieux	8,617	16.39	
PCF	Colette Dessaint	7,252	13.80	
DVD	Pierre Doise	2,563	4.88	
LV	Marie Cuvillier	1,908	3.63	
DVD	Vincent Cambier	1,110	2.11	
Others	N/A	3,125		
Turnout		55,641	73.43	
2nd round result
PS	Brigitte Douay	28,123	51.71	
DVD	François-Xavier Villain	26,264	48.29	
Turnout		57,812	76.30	
PS gain from RPR				

== Sources ==
- Official results of French elections from 1998: "Résultats électoraux officiels en France" (in French).
