= Canton of Roubaix-1 =

Coordinates: 50.69°N 3.18°E

The canton of Roubaix-1 is an administrative division of the Nord department, northern France. It was created at the French canton reorganisation which came into effect in March 2015. Its seat is in Roubaix.

It consists of the following communes:

1. Roubaix (partly)
