= Alex Türk =

French politician (born 1950)

Alex Türk (born 25 January 1950 in Roubaix) is a French politician who served as a member of the Senate of France, representing the Nord department from 1992 to 2017. He does not align himself with any political party.
