= Canton of Tourcoing-2 =

Coordinates: 50.72°N 3.16°E

The canton of Tourcoing-2 is an administrative division of the Nord, a department I northern France. It was created at the French canton reorganisation which came into effect in March 2015. Its seat is in Tourcoing.

It consists of part of Tourcoing commune.
