= Guy Bricout =

French politician (born 1944)

Member of the National Assembly for Nord's 18th constituency
- In office 21 June 2017 – 9 June 2024
- Preceded by: François-Xavier Villain
- Succeeded by: Alexandre Dufosset

Mayor of Caudry
- In office 1995–2017
- Preceded by: Jacques Warin
- Succeeded by: Frédéric Bricout

Personal details
- Born: 18 February 1944 (age 82) Caudry, Nord, France
- Party: UDI
- Education: University of Lille
- Profession: Tax inspector

Guy Bricout (born 18 February 1944) is a French politician representing the Union of Democrats and Independents. He was elected to the French National Assembly on 18 June 2017, representing the department of Nord.

Bricout entered politics in 1971 when he became councilor for the Caudry commune. He was then elected mayor of Caudry in 1995 as part of the Miscellaneous right, a position he would hold until his election as parliamentarian in 2017. Bricout has one son named Frédéric who is a councilor for Caudry. His other son Olivier died in 2012 at the age of 47.

== Decoration ==
- Knight of the Legion of Honor (2003)
