= Bondues =

- Commune
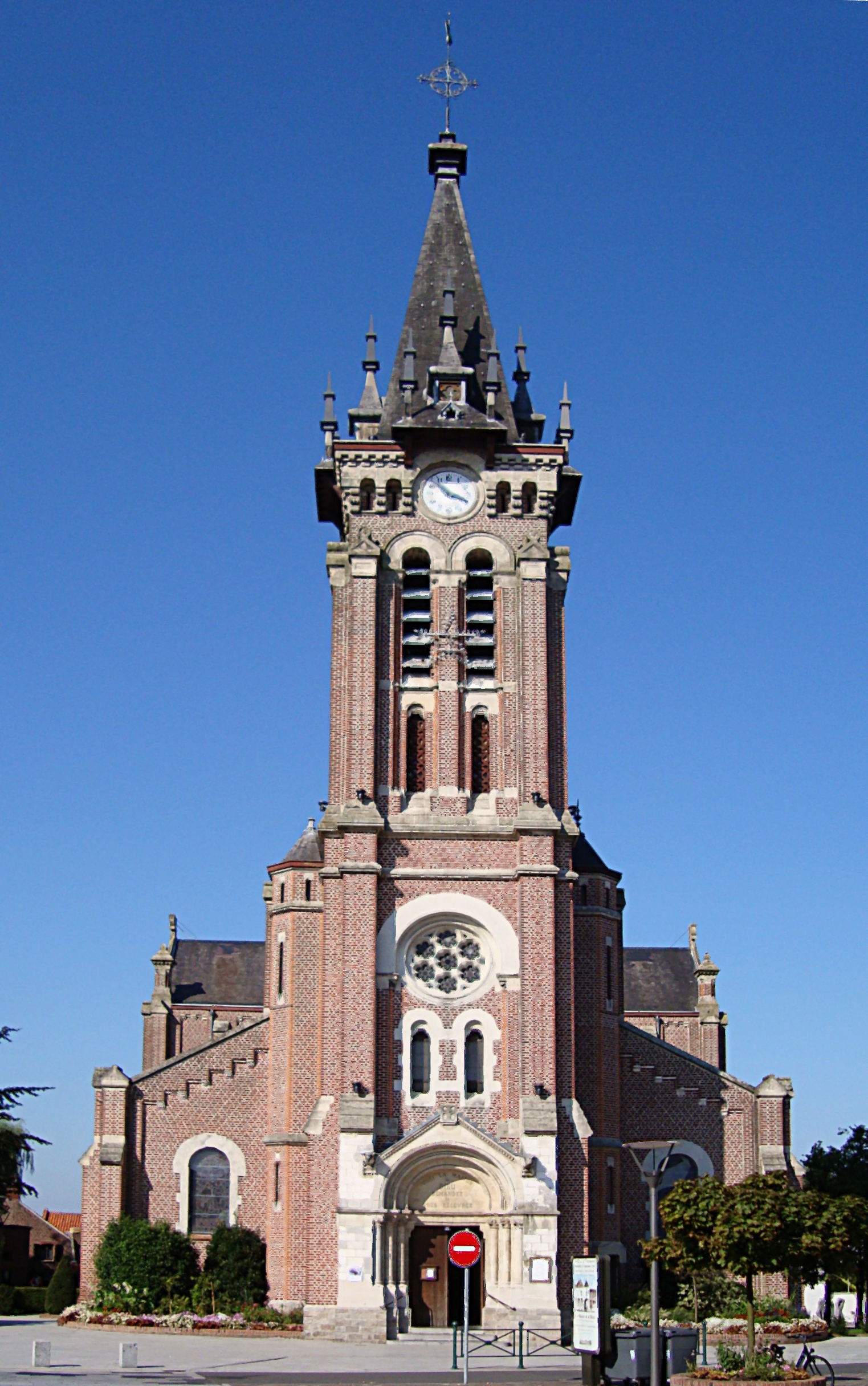
- The church in Bondues

- Coat of arms
- Location of Bondues
- Location within France Location within Hauts-de-France
- Coordinates: 50°42′08″N 3°05′38″E
- Country: France
- Region: Hauts-de-France
- Department: Nord
- Arrondissement: Lille
- Canton: Lille-2
- Intercommunality: Métropole Européenne de Lille

Government
  - Mayor (2020–2026): Patrick Delebarre
- Area^{1}: 13.05 km^{2} (5.04 sq mi)
- Elevation: 33 m (108 ft)
- Highest elevation: 53 m (174 ft)
- Lowest elevation: 18 m (59 ft)
- Population (2023): 9,747
  - Density: 746.9/km^{2} (1,934/sq mi)
- Time zone: UTC+01:00 (CET)
  - Summer (DST): UTC+02:00 (CEST)
- INSEE/Postal code: 59090 /59910
- ^{1} French Land Register data, which excludes lakes, ponds, glaciers > 1 km^{2} (0.386 sq mi or 247 acres) and river estuaries.

Bondues (French pronunciation: [bɔ̃dy]; Dutch: Bonduwe) is a commune in the Nord department in northern France.

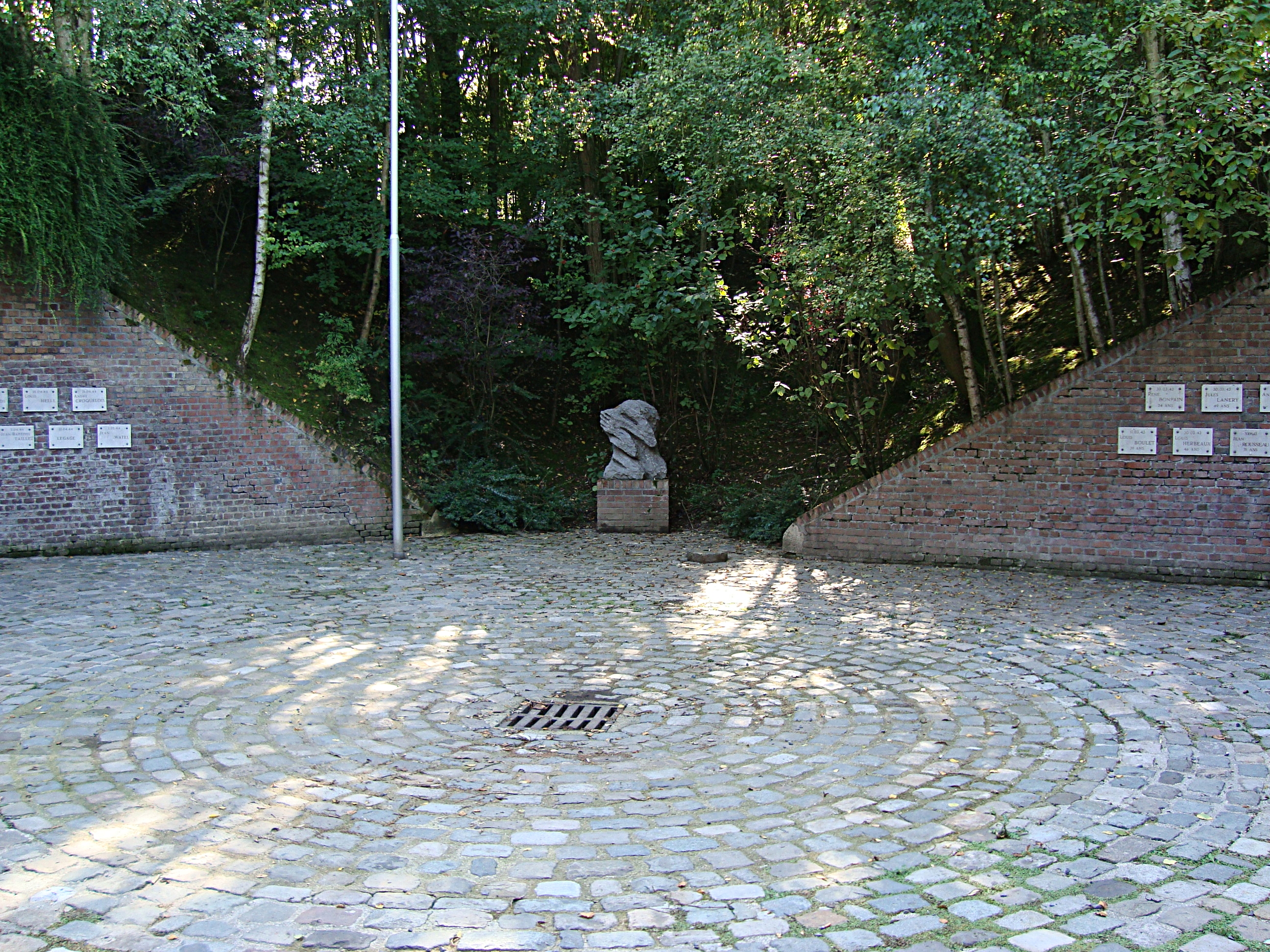
Monument to the shot

Since 1997, Bondues has housed a Museum devoted to the Resistance of the Nord-Pas de Calais region. The Fort of Bondues, also known as Fort Lobau, was built near the confluence of the Marque and Deûle rivers, by General Séré de Rivières, from 1877 to 1880. It is an element of the chain of forts and fortifications constituting the defence system around Lille. It was the place of execution of 68 members of the resistance in 1943/4.

== Population ==
Historical population

Year	Pop.	±% p.a.
1793	2,313	—
1800	2,254	−0.37%
1806	2,383	+0.93%
1821	2,573	+0.51%
1831	2,841	+1.00%
1836	2,851	+0.07%
1841	2,925	+0.51%
1846	3,027	+0.69%
1851	3,028	+0.01%
1856	3,127	+0.65%
1861	3,375	+1.54%
1866	3,380	+0.03%
1872	3,294	−0.43%
1876	3,289	−0.04%
1881	3,206	−0.51%
1886	3,246	+0.25%
1891	3,447	+1.21%
1896	3,146	−1.81%
1901	3,147	+0.01%

Year	Pop.	±% p.a.
1906	3,113	−0.22%
1911	3,311	+1.24%
1921	2,746	−1.85%
1926	2,876	+0.93%
1931	2,979	+0.71%
1936	3,188	+1.37%
1946	3,161	−0.09%
1954	3,310	+0.58%
1962	3,574	+0.96%
1968	3,961	+1.73%
1975	6,706	+7.81%
1982	8,840	+4.03%
1990	10,281	+1.91%
1999	10,680	+0.42%
2007	10,082	−0.72%
2012	9,828	−0.51%
2017	10,103	+0.55%
2023	9,747	−0.60%

Source: EHESS and INSEE (1968-2023)

== Heraldry ==
Arms of Bondues	The arms of Bondues are blazoned : Or, a canton sable.

== International relations ==
Bondues is twinned with:

- (United Kingdom) Haywards Heath, West Sussex, England (since 1992)
- Wülfrath, Germany (since 2003)

== Sports ==
FC Bondues is a local soccer club. Merge between the historical US Bondues and the CJ Bondues. President Herbaux and his crew help with the continual growth of the club which will compete at the highest level yet in 2023 in the R1 division.

Legends of the club are: Martin Colpaert, Kevin Jehu, Jean Decru, Arnaud Wallard among many.

== See also ==
- Communes of the Nord department
