= Miscellaneous centre =

French political term

Miscellaneous centre (Divers centre, DVC) in the nation of France refers to centrist candidates who are not members of any large party. It is a nuanced and de facto a political label created by the French Ministry of the Interior in 2020.

Affiliated MPs in the 15th legislature (2017 to 2022) sat as Non-Attached Members.

== History ==
From 2001 to 2008, the declaration of political nuance "without label" is no longer authorized by the Ministry of the Interior and the nuance "various centers" does not exist, the candidates and lists presenting themselves as "without label" or "Centrists" were then classified as "various right" (DVD) or "various left" (DVG) according to the political tendency declared or supposed closest. In 2008, the introduction of the LDIV nuance for the “miscellaneous” list made it possible to counterbalance this device.

== Controversy ==
Several opposition parties accuse the government of having created this new political nuance to "manipulate" the municipal elections of March 2020 by promoting the results of La République en Marche! and its allies.

== Membership ==
Since the dissolution of Ecology Democracy Solidarity in October 2020.

- Paula Forteza
- Olivier Gaillard
- Albane Gaillot
- Cédric Villani
- Matthieu Orphelin

Since 2022:

- Christine Decodts

== See also ==
- Union of the Centre, another related de facto political label also used in 2020 to refer to a local alliance of candidates belonging to several centrist political parties
- Miscellaneous right
- Miscellaneous left
