= Michèle Peyron =

French politician (born 1961)

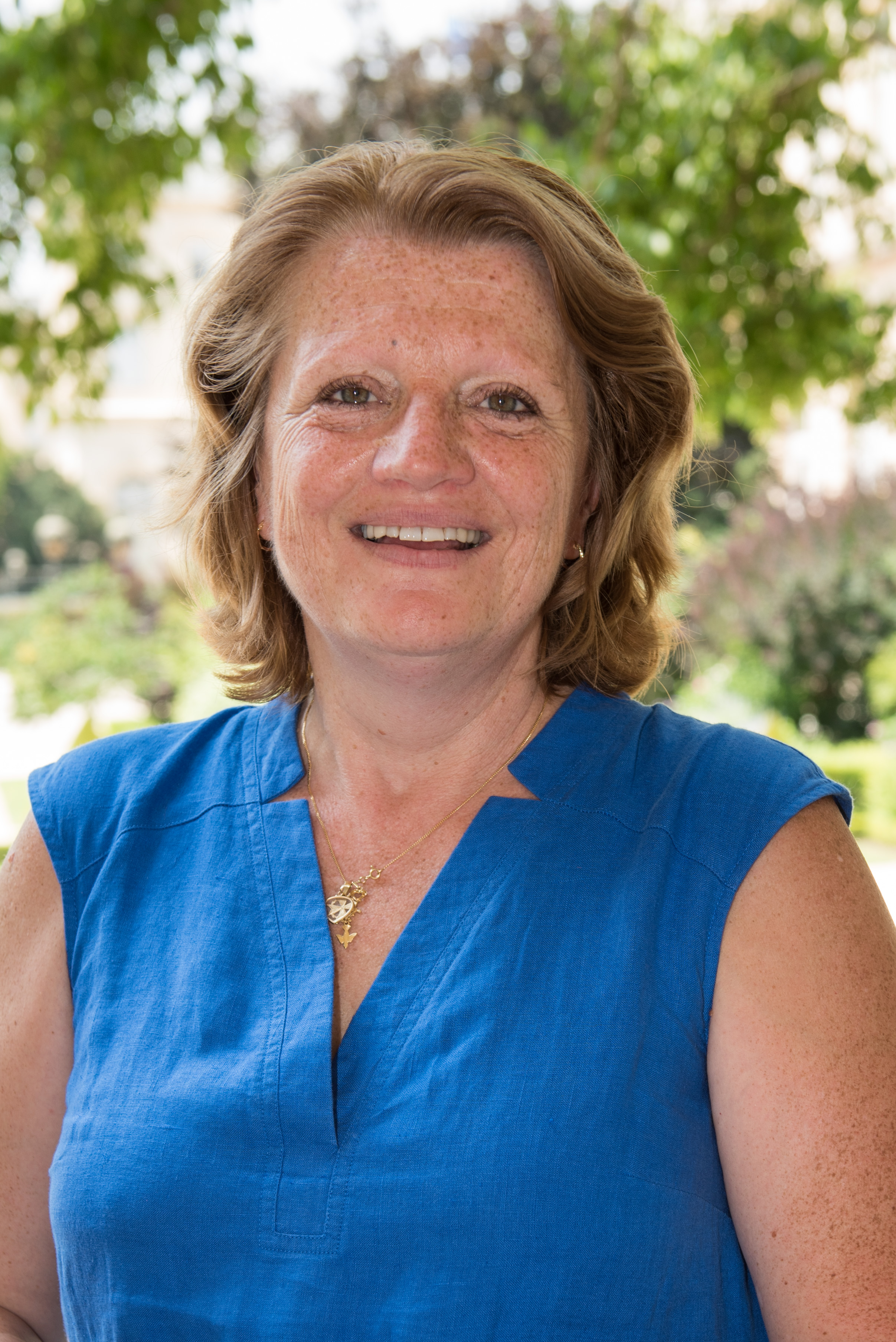

Member of the National Assembly for Seine-et-Marne's 9th constituency
- In office 21 June 2017 – 9 June 2024
- Preceded by: Guy Geoffroy
- Succeeded by: Céline Thiébault-Martinez

Personal details
- Born: 22 July 1961 (age 64) Nîmes, France
- Party: Renaissance (2016–2020, 2022–present)
- Other political affiliations: Socialist Party (prior to 2016); Territories of Progress (2020–2022)

Michèle Peyron (born 22 July 1961) is a French politician of Renaissance (RE, formerly La République En Marche!) who has represented the 9th constituency of the Seine-et-Marne department in the National Assembly from the 2017 legislative election until 2024.

== Political career ==
In the 1995 municipal election, Peyron first became a municipal councillor in Le Pradet, Var, in Southern France, at the time representing the Socialist Party (PS). In May 2016, she joined En Marche! (later La République En Marche!) and became head of the movement's local branch in Seine-et-Marne.

She successfully ran for the National Assembly in the 2017 legislative election in which she succeeded outgoing The Republicans representative Guy Geoffroy. In Parliament, Peyron serves as member of the Committee on Social Affairs. In addition to her committee assignments, she is part of the French-Vietnamese Parliamentary Friendship Group. In 2018, she also joined a parliamentary working group on the G5 Sahel, which is studying how to help Burkina Faso, Chad, Mali, Mauritania and Niger confront terrorist groups in the region.

In March 2020, LREM group chairman Gilles Le Gendre appointed Peyron and Mickaël Nogal as the parliamentary majority's rapporteurs on economic and health emergency measures amid the COVID-19 pandemic in France. In 2020, Peyron joined En commun (EC), a group within LREM led by Barbara Pompili.

In the 2022 legislative election, Peyron successfully ran for reelection to a second term in office under the Ensemble (ENS) coalition.

Following Fadila Khattabi's appointment to the government amid a 2023 cabinet reshuffle, Peyron became one of the two candidates (alongside Charlotte Lecocq of Nord) to succeed her as chairwoman of the Committee on Social Affairs.

In the 2024 French legislative election, she was unseated when she withdrew after the first round to avoid a triangular election. The seat was won by Socialist candidate Céline Thiébault-Martinez.

== Political positions ==
In a 2017 parliamentary debate on extending immunisation coverage in France, Peyron publicly recounted her personal experience of losing a child at birth in 1986 due to lack of prior immunisation.

== Personal life ==
Peyron has two children.

== See also ==
- List of deputies of the 15th National Assembly of France
- List of deputies of the 16th National Assembly of France
