= Kheira Bouziane-Laroussi =

French politician (born 1953)

Member of the Municipal council of Quetigny
- Incumbent
- Assumed office 30 March 2008

Member of the National Assembly for Côte-d'Or's 3rd constituency
- In office 19 June 2012 – 19 June 2017
- Preceded by: Claude Darciaux
- Succeeded by: Fadila Khattabi

Personal details
- Born: Kheira Bouziane; 23 August 1953 (age 72) Oran, Algeria
- Party: Socialist Party

Kheira Bouziane-Laroussi (born 23 August 1953) is a French politician, elected in 2012 (as Kheira Bouziane) as a deputy for the Socialist Party.

In 2008 she became alderman for solidarity and family in Quetigny, a town in Côte-d'Or. She was chosen as the Socialist Party candidate for the 2012 French legislative election in the Côte-d'Or's 3rd constituency, already held by a female Socialist MP since 2002. It was a constituency reserved for a woman candidate, and all three candidates at the internal Socialist primaries had non European roots, Kheira Bouziane and Fadila Khattabi from Algeria and Safia Otokoré from Somalia. She was finally selected. She had been a leading local member of the support committee for Martine Aubry for the French presidential primaries to select the Socialist Party candidate in 2011. She finished first in the first round, with 37.98%, and won the second round with 53.05%.

She stood in the 2017 election for Côte-d'Or's 3rd constituency as a Miscellaneous left candidate, and did not make the second round, which was won by LREM's Fadila Khattabi.
