= Killing of Lyhanna Rameau Bernard =

2026 child killing in Gers, Southwestern France

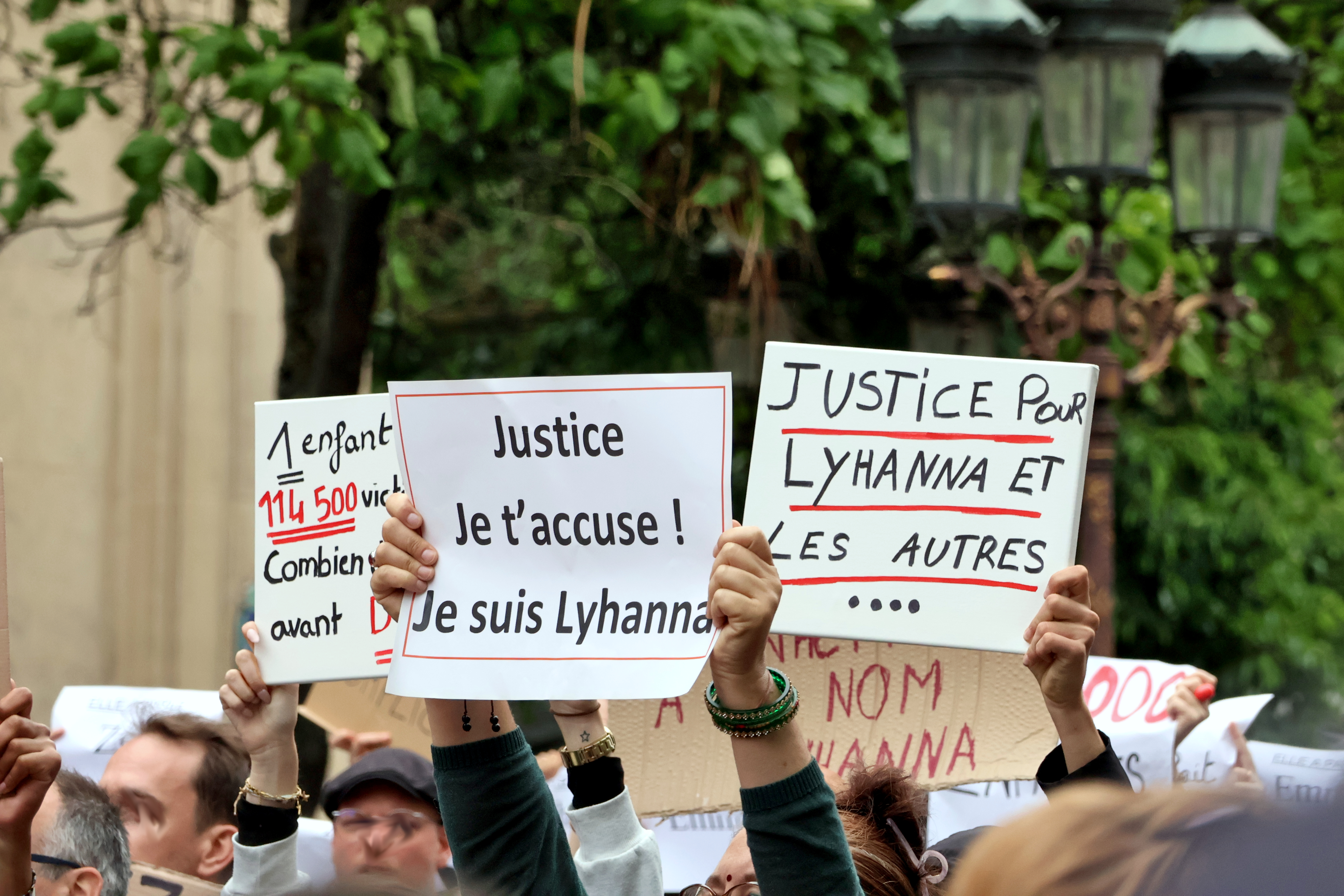
- A rally held in Paris on 8 June, calling for justice for Lyhanna Rameau Bernard
- Location: 48°53′1.91″N 2°23′22.2″E; Fleurance, France
- Date: 29 May 2026; 5 months ago
- Attack type: Rape; murder
- Weapon: Unknown
- Victim: Lyhanna Rameau Bernard
- Charges: Kidnapping, sequestration, rape and murder of a minor under 15

On 29 May 2026, Lyhanna Rameau Bernard, an 11-year-old middle school student in Fleurance (Gers), France, was found raped and killed following her disappearance. The case generated significant national media coverage and raised questions about the follow-up investigation of previous reports concerning the main suspect, with protesters demanding reform of the justice system.

== Disappearance ==
Lyhanna Rameau Bernard was born on 8 August 2014. Her family moved to Gers, a small department in southwest France, after her birth. She lived in Fleurance and attended the sixth grade there before her death.

On 29 May 2026, Bernard disappeared after leaving school to visit her friends. She was picked up by a 41-year-old, the father of her friend, who had previously been reported to police.

== Discovery of the body ==
On 4 June 2026, investigators discovered a body in a silo of a former cooperative in Puycasquier (Gers) where the suspect had previously worked. The following day, the public prosecutor's office of Auch announced that genetic analyses confirmed the body was that of Bernard.

On 18 June 2026, the results of the medico-legal expert reports confirmed that Bernard had been raped before her death.

== Suspect ==
The main suspect was taken into custody on 30 May 2026, charged with kidnapping and rape of a minor under 15 years of age, and placed in pre-trial detention before the proceedings were reclassified as murder. After the discovery of a body on 4 June, the charge of murder of a minor under 15 years of age was added to the indictment.

The suspect was also accused of kidnapping and raping a 17-year-old girl in 2020 and a 7-year-old girl in 2022. The case was transferred to the Auch public prosecutor's office in 2024, but was closed due to lack of evidence. Victims were allegedly forced to keep quiet. In 2025, the suspect was accused of raping a 10-year-old girl, and according to Le Parisien, in February 2026, the Auch prosecutor's office requested that the gendarmerie take the suspect into custody.

The suspect had previously been reported to the French National Office for Minors by the American National Center for Missing & Exploited Children due to his internet activity.

In June 2026, the Inspectorate General of the National Gendarmerie produced a report concerning mistakes made that led to the Bernard case. They indicated that investigators had used Agence nationale des techniques d'enquêtes numériques judiciaires tools when investigating prior complaints against the suspect, but did not take action on the results obtained.

== Reactions ==
Feminist and childist rally held in Paris in response to the killing of Bernard, 8 June 2026.

Many celebrities and politicians including Flavie Flament, Juliette Binoche, and Emmanuelle Béart took social media to express anger and demand justice for Bernard. Over the following weeks protests were held in multiple cities across France, with protesters demanding reform of the justice system, with over 60,000 people attending protests the Monday following Bernard's death.

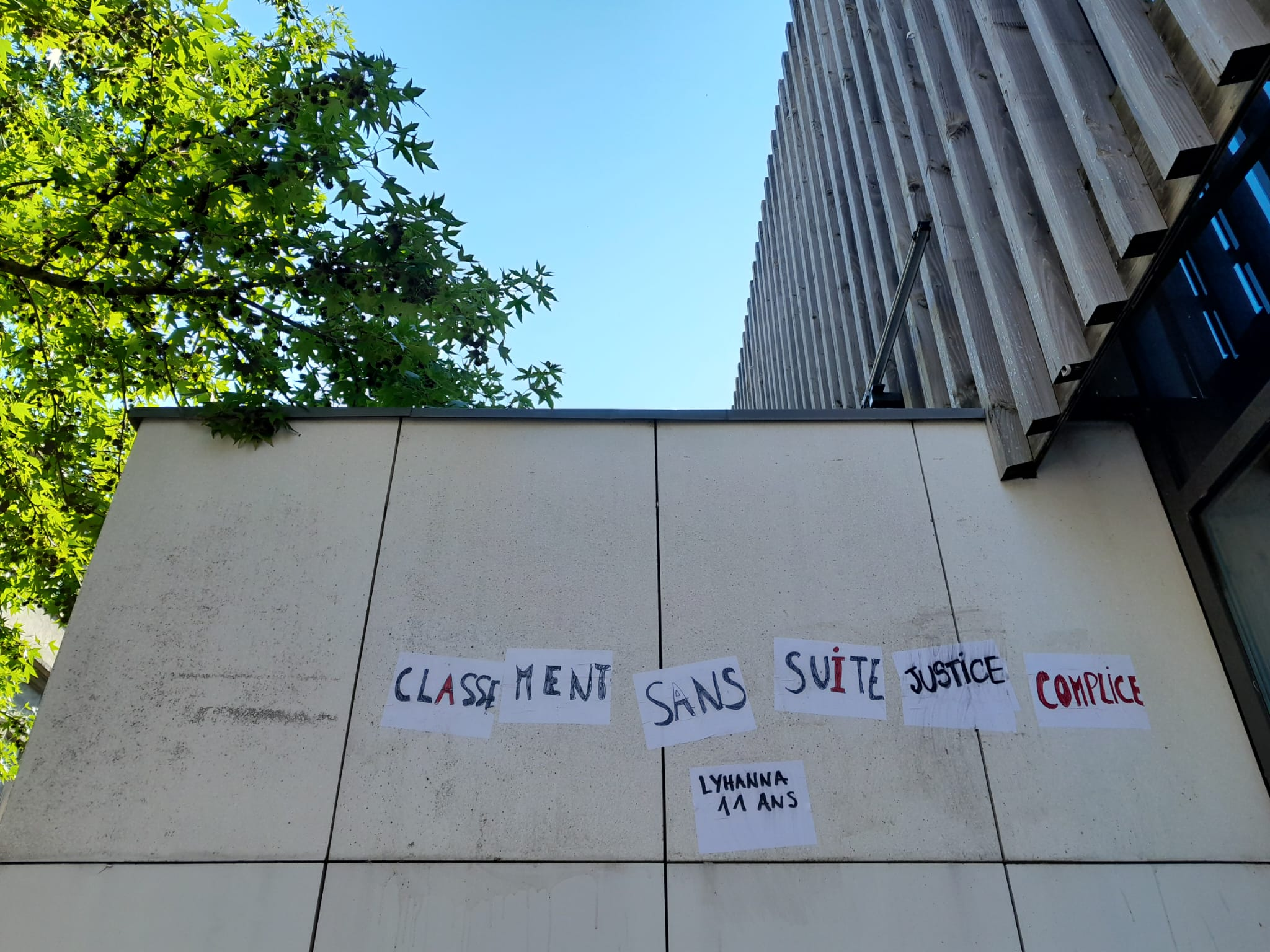
Graffiti in Grenoble reading "Case dismissed. Justice complicit. Lyhanna, 11 years old." June 2026

A bill proposed in November 2025 by Socialist Party member of the National Assembly Céline Thiébault-Martinez, that seeks to combat sexual violence against women and children, received significant media and political attention in response to the killing of Bernard.

On 9 June 2026, the mother of a prior reported victim of the suspect filed a complaint against the State and the Minister of Justice Gérald Darmanin for gross negligence. Also in June, following the media coverage of the case, other alleged assaults were reported to the Côtes-d'Armor and Tarn-et-Garonne prosecutor's offices.

Le Monde reported that the killing of Bernard and subsequent outrage were the most serious political crisis Darmanin has faced since taking office.

On 15 June, a cross-party delegation of MPs called for the promulgation of a "comprehensive law against sexist and sexual violence" aimed at better protecting women and children, and were received by Prime Minister Sébastien Lecornu. Several political figures, including Édouard Philippe and Bruno Retailleau, as well as Darmanin, have called to return the power to investigate individual cases to the Minister of Justice, a power abolished in 2013 during a reform on the independence of prosecutors.

On 22 June, Darmanin announced the opening of an administrative investigation against the magistrate of the Auch prosecutor's office. Without waiting for the final report from the General Inspectorate of Justice, it withdrew from the magistrate "her authorisation to conduct investigations and deal with cases concerning minors". In response, the Union syndicale des magistrats, declared that Darmanin had "lost the confidence of the magistrates", with the Union arguing that the magistrates were being used as scapegoats for government policy.
