= Jean Moulliere =

French politician (born 1994)

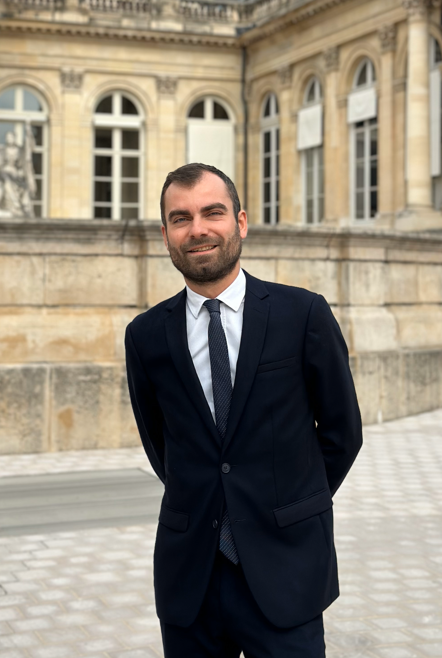
- Moulliere in 2024

Member of the French National Assembly for Nord's 6th constituency
- Incumbent
- Assumed office 28 October 2024
- Preceded by: Charlotte Lecocq

Personal details
- Born: 29 March 1994 (age 32)
- Party: Horizons (since 2021)

Jean Moulliere (born 29 March 1994) is a French politician serving as a member of the National Assembly since 2024. He has been a municipal councillor of Templeuve-en-Pévèle since 2014.
