= Vincent Ledoux =

French politician (born 1966)

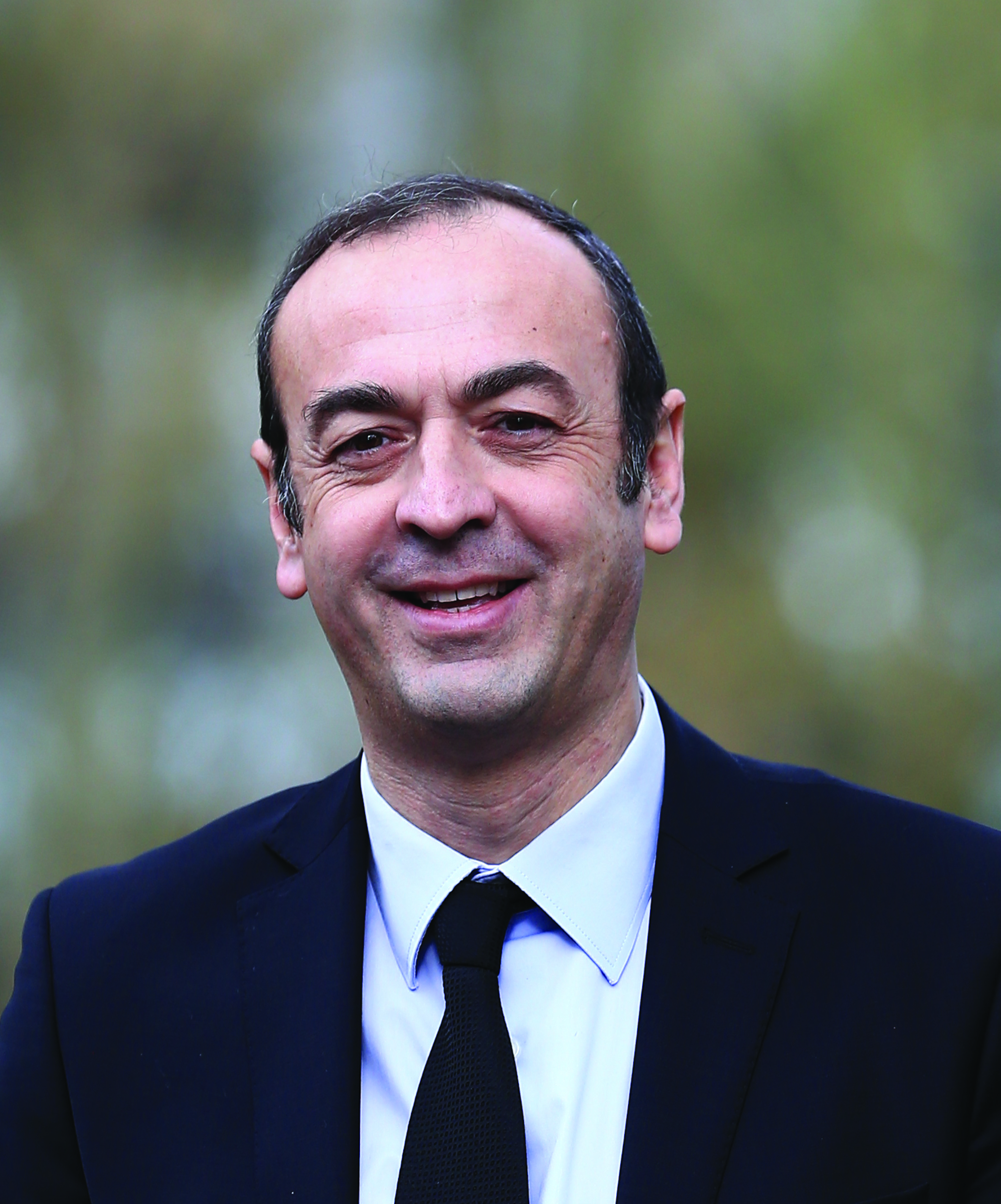

Member of the National Assembly for Nord's 10th constituency
- Incumbent
- Assumed office 24 January 2025
- Preceded by: Gérald Darmanin
- In office 23 July 2022 – 9 June 2024
- Preceded by: Gérald Darmanin
- Succeeded by: Gérald Darmanin
- In office 21 March 2016 – 21 June 2022
- Preceded by: Gérald Darmanin
- Succeeded by: Gérald Darmanin

Personal details
- Born: 21 January 1966 (age 60) Belfort, France
- Party: Renaissance (since 2022)
- Other political affiliations: Rally for the Republic (until 2002); Union for a Popular Movement (2002–2012); Union of Democrats and Independents (2012–2015); The Republicans (2015–2017); Agir (2017–2022)
- Education: Lille 2 University of Health and Law

Vincent Ledoux (born 21 June 1966) is a French politician served as a member of the National Assembly from March 2016 to June 2022 and July 2022 to June 2025, representing the 10th constituency of the department of Nord.

== Political career ==
In the Republicans' 2016 primaries, Ledoux endorsed Nicolas Sarkozy as the party's candidate for the 2017 French presidential election.

In parliament, Ledoux serves on the Finance Committee. He was previously a member of the Committee on Cultural Affairs and Education from 2016 until 2019.

He was substitute for Gérald Darmanin at the 2022 French legislative election, and replaced him when he was reappointed to the Borne government.

== See also ==
- 2017 French legislative election
