= Jacques Heuclin =

Jacques Heuclin (July 10, 1946 in Paris-October 31, 2007) was a French racing driver and politician.

== Racing career ==
Heuclin began racing at high levels of competition during the early 1970s. He officially qualified as a professional driver by 1975.

In 1986, Heuclin won the French Circuit Championship. He participated in several other racing series during his career as a driver, including the World Sportscar Championship, Interserie, the European Sportscar Championship and the FFSA GT Championship.

On eleven occasions, Heuclin raced in the 24 Hours of Le Mans. His best finish came in 1987 with an 11th place showing.

== Political career ==
A member of the Socialist Party, Heuclin became Mayor of Pontault-Combault in 1977 and remained so for the rest of his life. He also held multiple other political offices over the years.

Heuclin held a seat on what is now the Departmental Council of Seine-et-Marne from 1979 to 1982 and the Regional Council of Île-de-France from 1986 until 1997. In 1991, he joined the National Assembly from Seine-et-Marne's 9th constituency for the first time, replacing Alain Vivien. Heuclin left the Assembly in 1993, but won a return in 1997.

In 2002, Heucline was defeated for re-election by Guy Geoffroy of the Union for a Popular Movement. He came out on the losing end once again in a 2007 re-match.
