= Christian Vanneste =

French politician

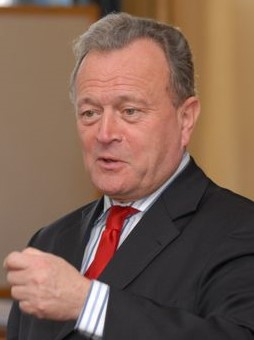

Member of the National Assembly for Nord's 10th constituency
- In office 2002–2012
- Preceded by: Jean-Pierre Balduyck
- Succeeded by: Gérald Darmanin

Personal details
- Born: 14 July 1947 (age 78) Tourcoing, France
- Party: UMP

Christian Vanneste (born 14 July 1947) is a French politician. He served two terms as a deputy in the French Parliament (2002-2012), representing the Union for a Popular Movement (UMP).

== Career ==
A member of the French Parliament, he was elected in the 10th constituency of Nord. He sat with the parliamentary group of the Union for a Popular Movement (UMP).

In 2005/2006, he reported on the controversial DADVSI copyright bill.

He was beaten in the first round of the June 2012 legislative elections.

== Controversy ==
In January 2006, Vanneste became the first French citizen to be fined €3,000 (in the first instance, but later relaxed) for his homophobic remarks. During a debate in the National Assembly of France, and afterwards in the media, he declared homosexual behavior a threat to the survival of humanity, and "morally inferior" to heterosexuality. The judgement, after a refused appeal, was eventually cancelled by the Cour de cassation on 12 November 2008.

In 2012, Vanneste again encountered controversy after referring to the deportation from France of homosexuals in the Holocaust as a "famous legend", though he acknowledges that they were persecuted in other parts of the Reich. Vanneste may or may not face Holocaust denial charges for the comment. He nevertheless received the support of Serge Klarsfeld the famous French "nazi-hunter". Dominique de Villepin, the former French Prime Minister also admitted that "on historical grounds", his comments were true.

He belongs to the Club de l'horloge (today Carrefour de l'horloge).
