= Céline Thiébault-Martinez =

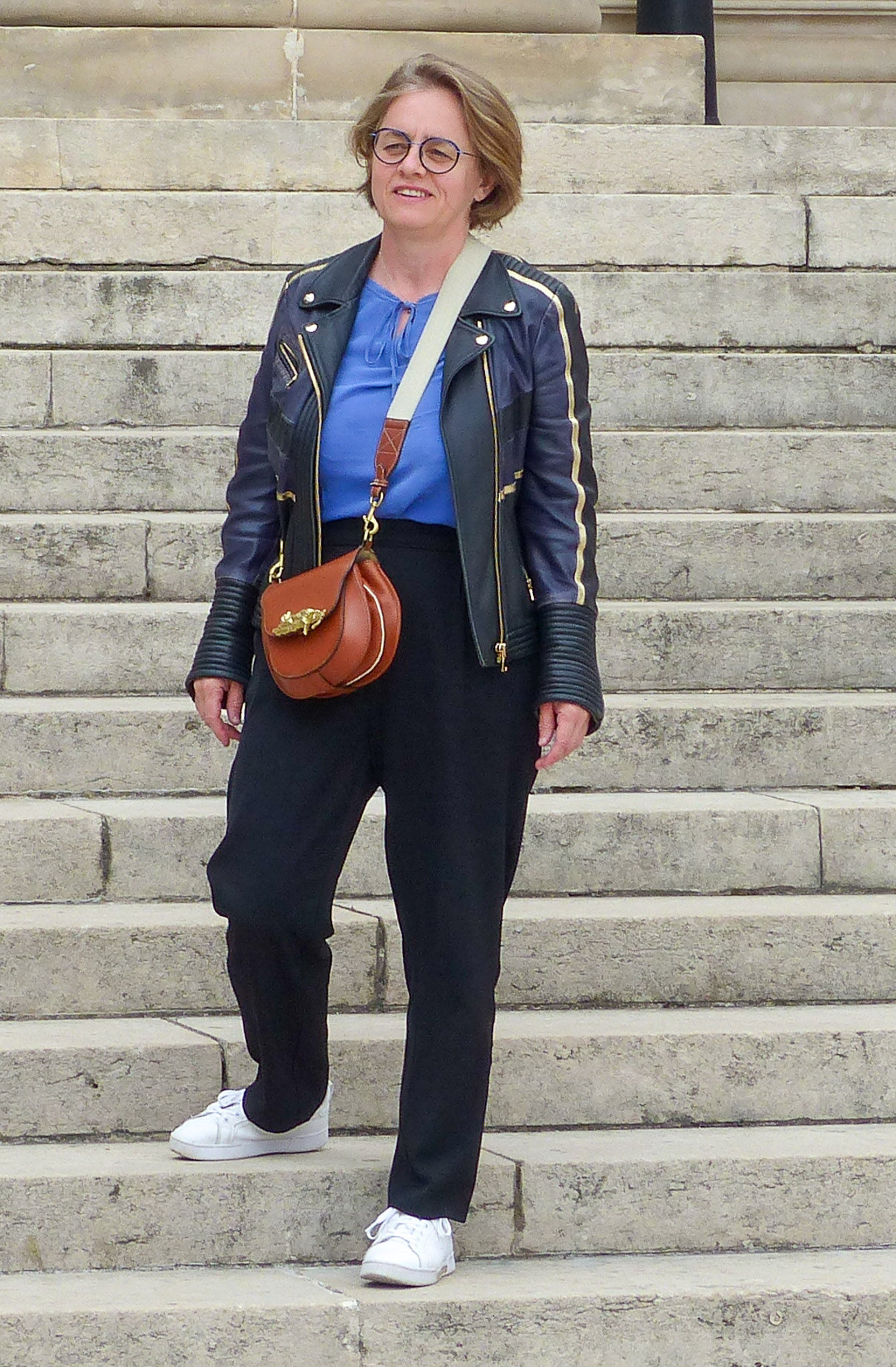
- Céline Thiébault-Martinez in 2024

Member of the National Assembly for Seine-et-Marne's 9th constituency
- Incumbent
- Assumed office 8 July 2024
- Preceded by: Michèle Peyron

Personal details
- Born: 4 August 1974 (age 52) Charleville-Mézières, France
- Party: Socialist
- Education: Paris 1 Panthéon-Sorbonne University

Céline Thiébault-Martinez (born 4 August 1974) is a French politician from the Socialist Party. In the 2024 French legislative election, she was elected deputy for Seine-et-Marne's 9th constituency.

== Biography ==
Born in Charleville-Mézières, Céline Thiébault-Martinez lives in Combs-la-Ville. She comes from a modest background, the daughter of a mother who was a cleaner and a father who was an accountant. She holds a master's degree in health economics from Paris Panthéon-Sorbonne. A former member of the National Bureau of the UNEF, she chaired the Alumni Association.

In 2014, she joined the office of senator Laurence Rossignol, and became deputy chief of staff when she became Minister for Families, Children and Women's Rights (until 2017).

Apart from this time in practice, she has spent most of her career in the mutual insurance and social protection sector: LMDE, Mutuelle nationale territoriale, Intériale Mutuelle, Institut de la Protection Sociale Européenne. At the time of her election in 2024, she was director of the Mutuelle des Scop et des Scic.

She is best known for her activism and community involvement, particularly for women's rights. She is a member of the board of the Women's Assembly , an association chaired by Laurence Rossignol. She became president of the Coordination for the European Women's Lobby (CLEF) in June 2022, as a representative of the Women's Assembly.

A member of UNEF and then of the Socialist Party since 1995, she was elected as a deputy under the New Popular Front label in the legislative elections of July 2024 in Seine-et-Marne's 9th constituency. Coming second behind the (RN) in the first round in a three-way contest, the outgoing Macronist deputy Michèle Peyron who withdrew in her favour between the two rounds.

In November 2025, she submitted a comprehensive bill to combat sexual violence against women and children, supported across party lines by 8 groups in the National Assembly. This bill received significant media and political attention in June 2026 due to the killing of Lyhanna Rameau Bernard.

== See also ==
- List of deputies of the 17th National Assembly of France
