= Guy Geoffroy =

French politician

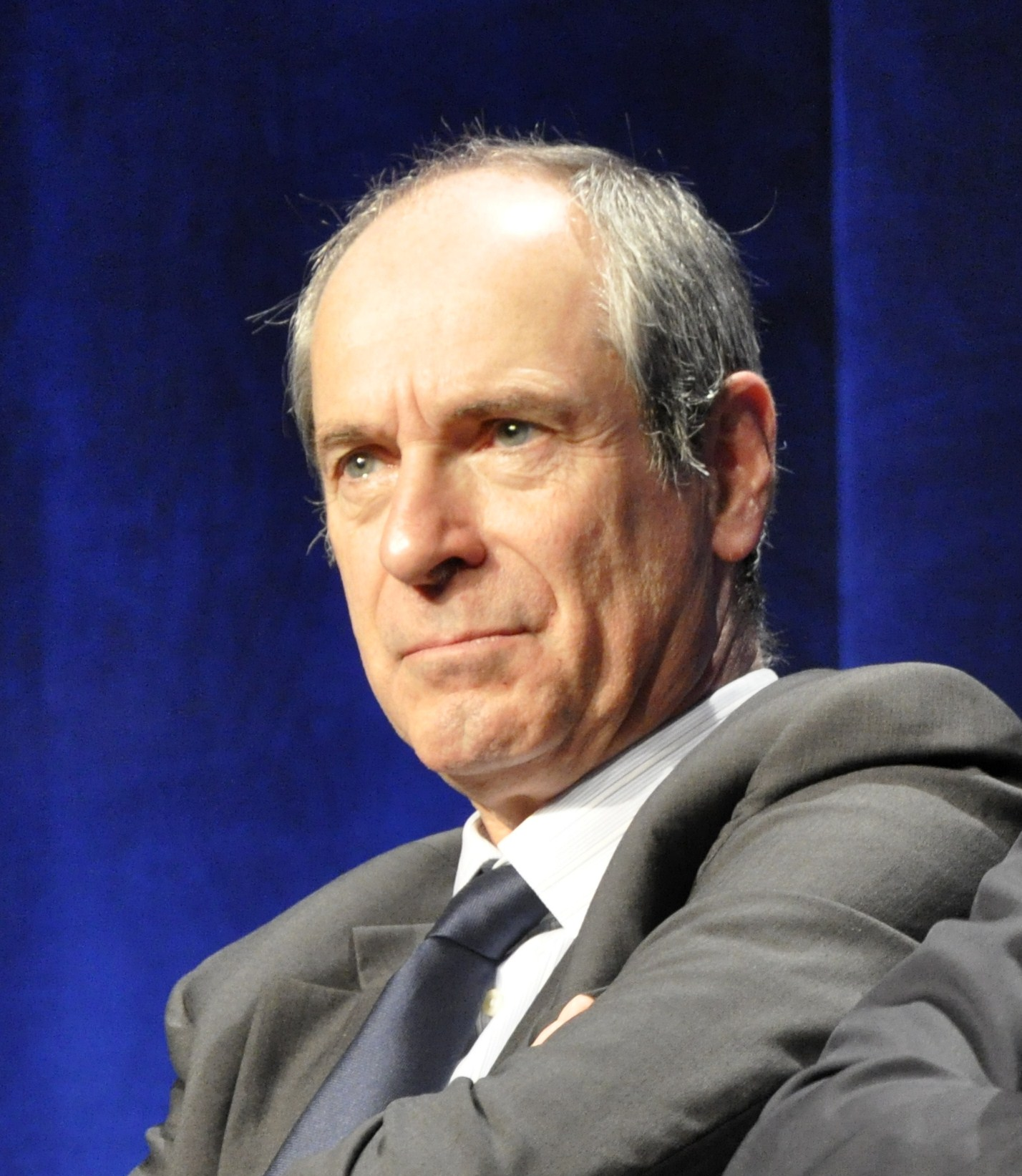

Mayor of Combs-la-Ville
- Incumbent
- Assumed office 25 June 1995

Member of the National Assembly for Seine-et-Marne's 9th constituency
- In office 2002–2017
- Preceded by: Jacques Heuclin
- Succeeded by: Michèle Peyron

Personal details
- Born: 26 May 1949 (age 76) Paris, France
- Party: The Republicans (2015–present)
- Other political affiliations: Union for a Popular Movement (2002–2010)

Guy Geoffroy (born 26 May 1949 in Paris) is a French member of the National Assembly of France and retired wrestler. He represents the Seine-et-Marne department, and is a member of the Union for a Popular Movement.
