= Nord's 10th constituency =

Constituency of the National Assembly of France

10th constituency of the North
- inline Constituency of the National Assembly of France

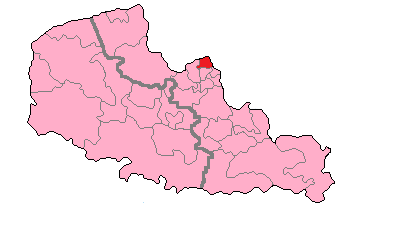
- Nord's 10th Constituency shown within Nord-Pas-de-Calais
- Deputy: Vincent Ledoux; Agir
- Department: Nord
- Cantons: Tourcoing-Nord, Tourcoing-Nord-Est
- Registered voters: 80,361

Nord's tenth constituency is a French legislative constituency in the Nord département (in the far North of France). It is one of twenty-one in that département, and covers two cantons (Tourcoing-Nord, and Tourcoing-Nord-Est), which together constitute part of the town of Tourcoing. (The southern part of the town of Tourcoing is part of Nord's 9th constituency.)

== Deputies ==
Election	Member	Party
1958	Maurice Schumann	UNR
1962	Maurice Schumann	CD
1967	Maurice Schumann	UDR
1968	Maurice Schumann	UDR
1973	Gérard Haesebroeck	PS
1978	Gérard Haesebroeck	PS
1981	Gérard Haesebroeck	PS
1986	Proportional representation - no election by constituency	
1988	Jean-Pierre Balduyck	PS
1993	Christian Vanneste	RPR
1997	Jean-Pierre Balduyck	PS
2002	Christian Vanneste	UMP
2007	Christian Vanneste	CNIP
2012	Gérald Darmanin	UMP
2016	Vincent Ledoux	LR
2017	Vincent Ledoux	LR
2017	Vincent Ledoux	Agir
2022	Gérald Darmanin	RE
2022	Vincent Ledoux	Agir

== Election results ==
=== 2024 ===
Legislative Election 2024: Nord's 10th constituency
Party	Candidate	Votes	%	±%
RN	Bastien Verbrugghe	16,675	34.31	+12.37
DIV	Jérôme Garcia	1,447	2.98	N/A
REC	Gustave Viguie-Desplaces	249	0.51	−2.87
LFI (NFP)	Leslie Mortreux	12,065	24.82	1.74
RE (Ensemble)	Gérald Darmanin	17,512	36.03	−3.05
DIV	Marcellin Brazon	118	0.24	N/A
LO	Christophe Charlon	535	1.10	N/A
Turnout		48,601	97.81	+59.79
Registered electors		83,192		
2nd round result
RE	Gérald Darmanin	28,603	61.37	+25.34
RN	Bastien Verbrugghe	18,001	38.63	+4.32
Turnout		46,604	95.27	−2.54
Registered electors		83,225		
RE hold		Swing		

=== 2022 ===
Legislative Election 2022: Nord's 10th constituency
Party	Candidate	Votes	%	±%
LREM (Ensemble)	Gérald Darmanin	11,950	39.08	+12.31
LFI (NUPÉS)	Leslie Mortreux	7,059	23.08	+0.54
RN	Mélanie D'Hont	6,709	21.94	+3.53
REC	Louis Bleuzé	1,035	3.38	N/A
LR (UDC)	Jérôme Garcia	934	3.05	−23.88
DVE	Oueb Leuchi	915	2.99	N/A
PA	Romain Van Gansen	794	2.60	N/A
Others	N/A	1,183		
Turnout		30,579	38.02	−0.72
2nd round result
LREM (Ensemble)	Gérald Darmanin	16,193	57.52	+13.45
LFI (NUPÉS)	Leslie Mortreux	11,957	42.48	N/A
Turnout		28,150	36.82	+4.53
LREM gain from LR				

=== 2017 ===
Candidate	Label	First round		Second round	
Candidate	Label	Votes	%	Votes	%
Vincent Ledoux	LR	8,385	26.93	13,168	55.93
Sophie Taïeb	REM	8,335	26.77	10,374	44.07
Virginie Rosez	FN	5,734	18.41		
Adélie Cormont	FI	3,886	12.48		
Yasmina Chigri	PS	1,581	5.08		
Olivier Descamps	ECO	1,064	3.42		
Jocelyne Lefebvre	PCF	487	1.56		
Frédéric Debruyne	DLF	444	1.43		
Christian Baeckeroot	EXD	428	1.37		
Christophe Charlon	EXG	294	0.94		
Oueb Leuchi	ECO	230	0.74		
Olivier Durnez	DIV	163	0.52		
Bernard Dujardin	DVD	77	0.25		
Léa Deturche	DIV	31	0.10		
Votes		31,139	100.00	23,542	100.00
Valid votes		31,139	98.00	23,542	88.89
Blank votes		443	1.39	1,989	7.51
Null votes		191	0.60	952	3.59
Turnout		31,773	38.74	26,483	32.29
Abstentions		50,235	61.26	55,525	67.71
Registered voters		82,008		82,008	
Source: Ministry of the Interior

=== 2012 ===
Following repeated homophobic statements by incumbent MP Christian Vanneste, the Union for a Popular Movement once more withdrew its endorsement of him (as it had done in 2007), but this time (unlike 2007) stood a candidate against him. Vanneste stood as the candidate of the Rally for France, a minor party of which he was the president since March 2012.

Vanneste was eliminated in the first round of the vote, finishing fourth with 13.18%. The Socialist and UMP candidates were qualified for the runoff, receiving respectively 30.69% and 25.06% of the vote.

Legislative Election 2012: Nord's 10th constituency
Party	Candidate	Votes	%	±%
PS	Zina Dahmani	11,550	30.77	
UMP	Gérald Darmanin	9,355	24.93	
FN	Jean Richard Sulzer	6,780	18.06	
RPF	Christian Vanneste	4,922	13.11	
FG	Dominique De Clercq Danel	1,651	4.40	
MoDem	Frédéric Lefebvre	947	2.52	
EELV	Bernard Despierre	908	2.42	
Others	N/A	1,419		
Turnout		37,532	46.70	
2nd round result
UMP	Gérald Darmanin	19,585	54.88	
PS	Zina Dahmani	16,100	45.12	
Turnout		35,685	44.41	
UMP gain from CNIP				

=== 2007 ===
Christian Vanneste, the incumbent MP for the Union for a Popular Movement, lost the endorsement of his party after making repeated homophobic remarks. He had said in particular that homosexuality was an "acquired habit" which could be lost through "reeducation"; that homosexuality was "sectarian", inherently "narcissistic" and a "threat to the survival of humanity"; and that all homosexuals were "heterophobic" Such comments are rare in France, and drew widespread condemnation. The UMP did not allow him to stand as its candidate, but it did not stand a candidate against him. Vanneste stood as the candidate of the National Centre of Independents and Peasants, an associate party of the UMP. After his successful reelection, he was fully reintegrated into the UMP, and sat as one of its members in Parliament.

Legislative Election 2007: Nord's 10th constituency
Party	Candidate	Votes	%	±%
CNIP	Christian Vanneste	18,058	46.26	
PS	Najat Azmy	8,235	21.10	
MoDem	Marie-Paule Heible	3,560	9.12	
FN	Christian Baeckeroot	3,199	8.19	
PCF	Alain Lambre	1,424	3.65	
LV	Bernard Despierre	1,354	3.47	
Far left	Yann Merlevede	1,103	2.83	
Others	N/A	2,103		
Turnout		40,044	51.07	
2nd round result
CNIP	Christian Vanneste	21,720	58.56	
PS	Najat Azmy	15,367	41.44	
Turnout		38,949	49.67	
CNIP gain from UMP				

=== 2002 ===
Legislative Election 2002: Nord's 10th constituency
Party	Candidate	Votes	%	±%
UMP	Christian Vanneste	13,503	32.38	
PS	Jean-Pierre Balduyck	13,368	32.06	
FN	Christian Baeckeroot	8,217	19.70	
UDF	Catherine Bacon	2,837	6.80	
Others	N/A	3,777		
Turnout		42,462	57.56	
2nd round result
UMP	Christian Vanneste	21,806	56.41	
PS	Jean-Pierre Balduyck	16,852	43.59	
Turnout		40,215	54.29	
UMP gain from PS				

=== 1997 ===
Legislative Election 1997: Nord's 10th constituency
Party	Candidate	Votes	%	±%
PS	Jean-Pierre Balduyck	13,532	29.61	
RPR	Christian Vanneste	12,194	26.68	
FN	Christian Baeckeroot	11,496	25.15	
PCF	Dominique de Clercq Danel	2,750	6.02	
LO	Bruno Vargiu	1,380	3.02	
GE	Patrick Beusaert	1,260	2.76	
DVD	Patrice Desrumaux	1,061	2.32	
DVE	Colette Hagard	946	2.07	
Others	N/A	1,086		
Turnout		47,791	67.45	
2nd round result
PS	Jean-Pierre Balduyck	20,991	42.55	
RPR	Christian Vanneste	18,733	37.97	
FN	Christian Baeckeroot	9,610	19.48	
Turnout		50,893	71.83	
PS gain from RPR				

== Sources ==
- Official results of French elections from 1998: "Résultats électoraux officiels en France" (in French).
