= Gérald Darmanin =

French politician (born 1982)

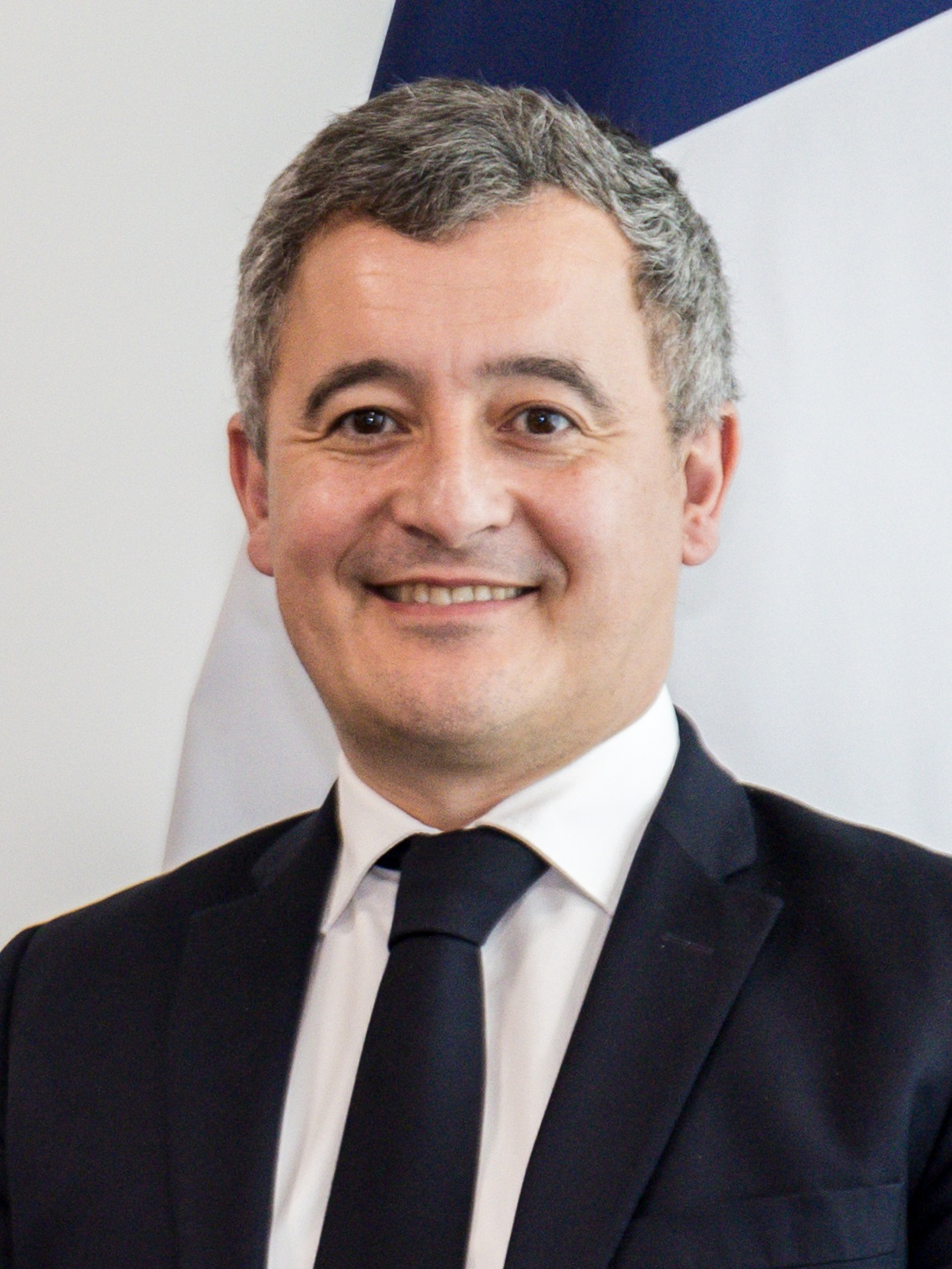
- Darmanin in 2025

Keeper of the Seals, Minister of Justice (Note: Minister of State until 12 October 2025.)
- Incumbent
- Assumed office 23 December 2024
- Prime Minister: François Bayrou; Sébastien Lecornu
- Preceded by: Didier Migaud

Member of the National Assembly for Nord's 10th constituency
- In office 8 July 2024 – 23 January 2025
- Preceded by: Vincent Ledoux
- Succeeded by: Vincent Ledoux
- In office 22 June 2022 – 22 July 2022
- Preceded by: Vincent Ledoux
- Succeeded by: Vincent Ledoux
- In office 20 June 2012 – 27 January 2016
- Preceded by: Christian Vanneste
- Succeeded by: Vincent Ledoux

Minister of the Interior and Overseas
- In office 6 July 2020 – 21 September 2024
- Prime Minister: Jean Castex; Élisabeth Borne; Gabriel Attal
- Preceded by: Christophe Castaner
- Succeeded by: Bruno Retailleau

Minister of Public Action and Accounts
- In office 17 May 2017 – 6 July 2020
- Prime Minister: Édouard Philippe
- Preceded by: Christian Eckert
- Succeeded by: Olivier Dussopt

Mayor of Tourcoing
- In office 4 April 2014 – 9 September 2017
- Preceded by: Michel-François Delannoy
- Succeeded by: Didier Droart

Member of the Regional Council of Hauts-de-France
- In office 4 January 2016 – 6 July 2020

Member of the Regional Council of Nord-Pas-de-Calais
- In office 26 March 2010 – 30 March 2014

Personal details
- Born: Gérald Moussa Jean Darmanin; 11 October 1982 (age 44) Valenciennes, France
- Party: Renaissance (2017–present)
- Other political affiliations: Rally for the Republic (1998–2002); Union for a Popular Movement (2002–2015); The Republicans (2015–2017)
- Spouse(s): Morgane Jumez (m. 2010; div. 2017) Rose-Marie Devillers (m. 2020)
- Children: 2
- Education: Sciences Po Lille
- Profession: Jurist • Politician

Gérald Moussa Jean Darmanin ([ʒeʁald daʁmanɛ̃]; born 11 October 1982) is a French politician who has been serving as Minister of Justice in the successive governments of Prime Ministers François Bayrou and Sébastien Lecornu since 2024. He previously served as Minister of the Interior in the governments of Prime Ministers Jean Castex, Élisabeth Borne and Gabriel Attal from 2020 to 2024.

A former member of The Republicans (LR), Darmanin has been a member of Renaissance (RE) since 2017. Darmanin was Mayor of Tourcoing from 2014 to 2017 and Minister of Public Action and Accounts in the first and second governments of Prime Minister Édouard Philippe from 2017 until 2020.

== Early life and education ==
Gérald Moussa Jean Darmanin was born to a working-class family with Algerian and Maltese roots. His father, Gérard Darmanin, managed a bistro and his mother, Annie Ouakid, worked as a cleaner. His maternal grandfather, Moussa Ouakid, born in 1907 in the douar (a camp of Algerian tents or small rural village of few little houses) Ouled Ghalia, in the Ouarsenis, in Algeria, was a Chief Warrant Officer in the French Army and decorated with the Médaille militaire. He served in the Algerian tirailleurs and was also a résistant in the French Forces of the Interior (FFI) during the Second World War and a Harki during the Algerian War.

Darmanin struggled academically while attending a public school in Valenciennes, so his parents decided to pay for private education in Paris. When they ran out of money for tuition, the school allowed Darmanin to finish his studies for free; in exchange, he had to spend years working as a hall monitor. After working odd jobs that included singing in the metro and waiting tables, he enrolled at Sciences Po Lille, following a year at Institut Catholique de Paris (ICP) in its preparatory school ("prépa" or "classe préparatoire") for entrance to Institutes of Political Studies IEP (known as Sciences Po) including the courses of a first year of DEUG in History (the daughter of Fuad II the last King of Egypt Princess Fawzia-Latifa of Egypt and Michel Fayad were then his classmates).

== Political career ==
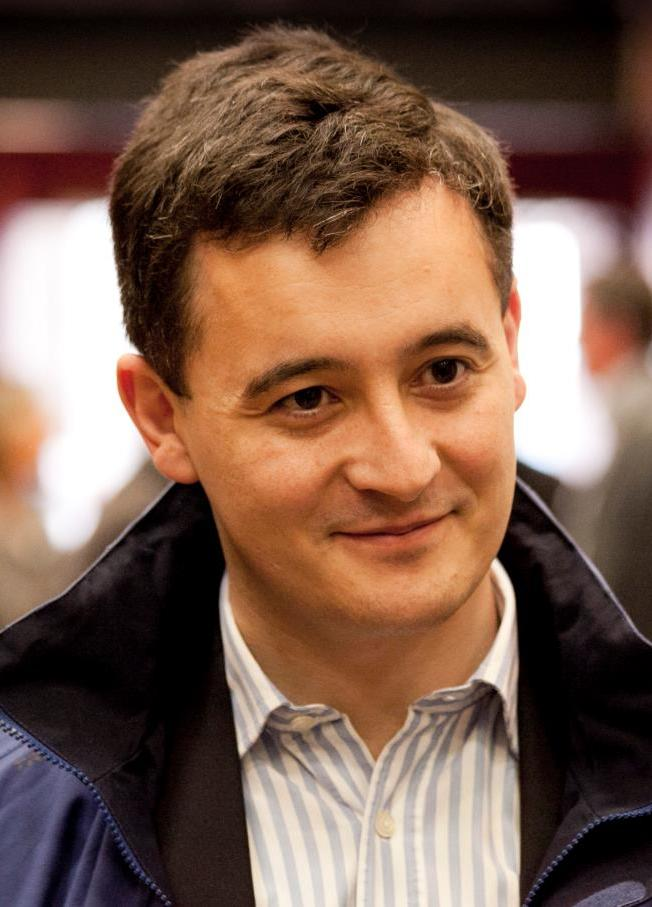
Gérald Darmanin, Member of Parliament for the Nord's 10th constituency 2013)

=== Early beginnings ===
Early on, Darminin worked as a parliamentary assistant for conservative MP Isabelle Vasseur before joining former minister and then Member of the European Parliament Jacques Toubon. He was taken under the wing of Toubon, who introduced him to UMP leaders such as Xavier Bertrand and helped him become chief of staff to Sarkozy's Minister of Sports, David Douillet.

In the 2012 legislative election, Darmanin was elected to the National Assembly in the tenth constituency of Nord; at the time, he was one of the country's youngest lawmakers. He ran two years later for election as Mayor of Tourcoing and won, establishing himself on the national political scene. Former President Nicolas Sarkozy brought Darmanin on board as director of his primary election campaign in 2016.

In response to the Fillon affair, Darmanin renounced his support for LR candidate François Fillon in the 2017 presidential election and resigned from his position as the party's deputy general secretary.

=== Minister of Public Action and Accounts, 2017–2020 ===
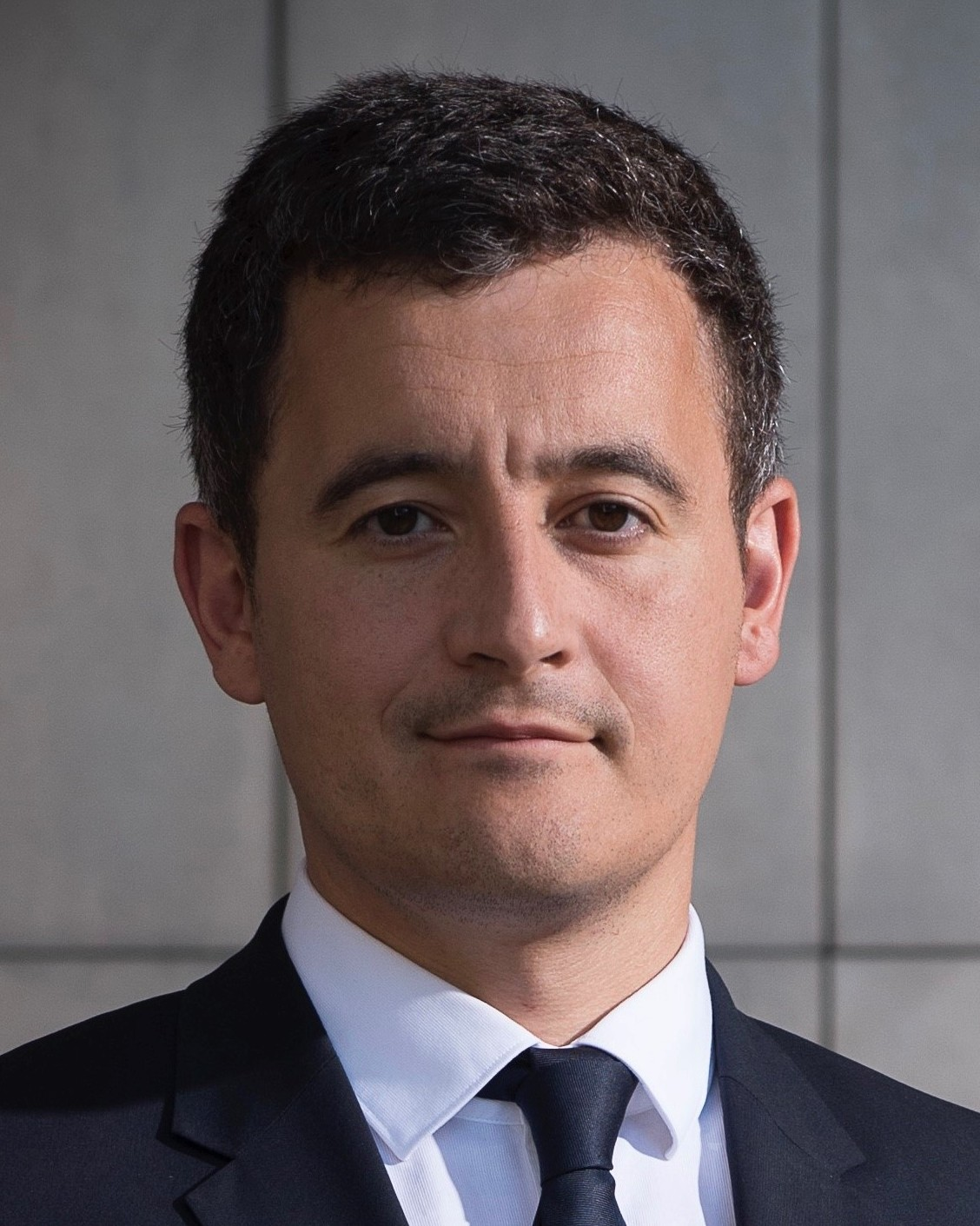
Darmanin in June 2017

In May 2017, Darmanin was appointed by President Emmanuel Macron to be Minister of Public Action and Accounts in the First Philippe government. In this capacity, he supported Bruno Le Maire, the Minister of the Economy and Finance, although himself a cabinet member. At the time of his appointment, he was one of the youngest members in Édouard Philippe's government.

Soon after taking office, Darmanin announced plans to achieve 4.5 billion euros ($5.13 billion) in savings on the French government's operational budget in 2017. That year, he managed to bring the country's budget deficit below the EU-mandated limit of 3 percent of GDP, the first time in a decade for France. He also helped implement Macron's main tax reforms and oversaw an overhaul of tax collection.

In 2018 Darmanin was accused of sexual coercion and harassment by two women relating to alleged misconduct in 2009 and between 2014 and 2017, with one of the women alleging that while Mayor of Tourcoing he asked for sexual favours in exchange for providing her with social housing. However prosecutors dropped the case, claiming an inability to determine an "absence of consent", as Darmanin denied both allegations. In June 2020, the Court of Appeal of Paris ordered the reopening of the investigation.

In 2019, Darmanin oversaw a widely discussed agreement between Google and French tax authorities, marking the end of a four-year investigation that looked at whether the company routed profits from its French activities to Ireland, which was a lower-tax jurisdiction at the time. Google eventually agreed to pay almost 1 billion euros to settle all of its litigation with the tax authorities.

In the early phase of the COVID-19 pandemic in France, Darmanin oversaw the government's efforts to mobilise 150 billion euros to support industries the hardest hit by the crisis as part of a response that pushed debt to record levels.

In the 2020 municipal election, Darmanin was reelected as Mayor of Tourcoing but resigned soon thereafter.

=== Minister of the Interior, 2020–2022 ===
In 2020, Darmanin was appointed Minister of the Interior in the government of Prime Minister Jean Castex, succeeding Christophe Castaner.

At the age of thirty-seven, Darmanin became the youngest Minister of the Interior of the Fifth Republic.

Following the murder of Samuel Paty by an Islamic terrorist in October 2020, Darmanin announced a large police sweep against several individuals. He also ordered the closing of the Pantin mosque in the Parisian suburb Seine-Saint-Denis after it re-broadcast a video containing false allegations about Paty. Darmanin subsequently ordered the dissolution of other associations with ties to radical Islam and deemed "separatist".

In response to the 2020 Nice stabbing committed by a Tunisian migrant, Darmanin negotiated deportation procedures with Tunisia.

In February 2020, Darmanin sponsored a bill that French lawmakers said they hoped would uproot radical Islam in France. Darmanin said the aim of the bill is to stop "an Islamist hostile takeover targeting Muslims". In March 2021, Darmanin went to court to prevent the building of a new mosque in Strasbourg, arguing dark money was involved in the project. In 2022, Darmanin closed the Islamic website La Voie Droite using the 2021 legislation. Also based on that legislation, he filed a successive objection against the city of Grenoble's decision to allow the use of body-covering "burkini" bathing suits for women in municipal pools in May 2022.

In early 2021, Darmanin also oversaw a ban of the Génération identitaire group, the youth wing of Bloc Identitaire, arguing that the organisation promoted "an ideology inciting hatred, violence and discrimination on the basis of one's origin, race or religion".

In May 2021, Darmanin asked the Paris police to block a planned pro-Palestinian rally amid the Israel–Palestine crisis; he urged police chiefs across France to remain vigilant, noting that "serious disturbances to public order were seen in 2014."

Following Jean Castex's resignation in May 2022, Macron appointed Élisabeth Borne, Minister of Labour and Darmanin's former colleague, as Prime Minister from 20 May 2022. Darmanin's position in the new government remained unchanged, with his responsibilities as Minister of the Interior.

Shortly after the new government was sworn in, the 2022 UEFA Champions League final at the Stade de France in Paris was marred by a huge scandal. Following the 2022 UEFA Champions League Final chaos many, including Borne, called for Darmanin's resignation. However, French President Emmanuel Macron stood by his interior minister wholeheartedly, to the extent that he survived the crisis with his powers strengthened in an almost unprecedented way.

By 2023, news media considered Darmanin one of Borne's main rivals inside the government and a potential candidate to succeed her.

Darmanin left the interior ministry in September 2024.

=== Minister of Justice, 2024–present ===
In December 2024, Darmanin was named justice minister in the Bayrou government.

In April 2025, Darmanin said in an interview that he wants to be president and was “working” on a platform.

== Political positions ==
In the past, Darmanin has openly spoken out and voted against same-sex marriage in France, and criticized the influence of gender studies in identity politics. He reportedly meets with or reads the writings of influential voices from the far end of the political spectrum, such as essayists Alain Finkielkraut or Éric Zemmour.

In 2020, Darmanin expressed his opposition against mail-in voting to facilitate voting during the public health crisis caused by the COVID-19 pandemic in France.

== Controversies ==
Two women have filed formal complaints against Darmanin alleging he abused of his authority to coerce them into sexual favours.

=== Accusation by Sophie Patterson-Spatz ===
A first accusation dates back to June 2017. Sophie Patterson-Spatz filed a criminal case against Darmanin accusing him of rape. The case was initially closed for procedural reasons. The investigation was reopened in June 2020 and Darmanin was cross-examined by a judge in March 2021. The non-consensual sexual encounter that Darmanin stands accused of would have taken place in March 2009. Patterson-Spatz contacted Darmanin in 2009 asking for his support to revisit a condemnation against her for blackmail and phone harassment of her ex-partner. Patterson-Spatz said that she felt obliged to "slip between the sheets" in exchange for Darmanin's support in her legal case. Darmanin does not deny having had a sexual encounter with Patterson-Spatz but said that the encounter did not involve a quid pro quo.

=== Accusation of abuse of weakness by a second complainant ===
In 2018, another woman filed a complaint against Darmanin for abuse of her weakness, an offence under French law designed to protect vulnerable citizens. The victim under the pseudonym Sarah shared a graphic description of her two alleged sexual encounters with Darmanin with the French online newspaper Mediapart. Sarah is an inhabitant of Tourcoing where Darmanin served as mayor. In 2016, Sarah contacted Darmanin to ask him to help her obtain a social housing placement. She described that in a conversation Darmanin placed her hand on his genitalia in an unsolicited manner.

The alleged victim said in respect to her sexual encounter with Darmanin that she "felt obliged to do it in order to get housing and a job." Letters sent by Darmanin to public authorities responsible for social housing attribution in France, in which Darmanin is asking for a placement for the alleged victim attest that Darmanin did intervene in her favour. The investigation was closed in May 2018 on the grounds that the complainant failed to evidence her lack of consent in her sexual encounters with Darmanin. External observers have pointed to unsettling similarities between the two sexual coercion cases.

=== Protests by women rights activists ===
Following Darmanin's appointment as Minister of the Interior in July 2020, hundreds of women protested in central Paris, demanding his immediate resignation due to his involvement in a rape lawsuit. The protesters claimed he was unfit for overseeing the police since he had admitted, in court proceedings, to have requested sexual favors from a woman in exchange for his support on her judicial case.

In response to a spate of incidents that erupted throughout the summer of 2020, including an armed clash involving Chechen groups and violence during the Bastille Day celebrations, Darmanin told newspaper Le Figaro that "it is necessary to stop the wilding (ensauvagement) of a certain part of society". His use of vocabulary previously used mostly by far-right groups met with criticism, including from members of his own party. In Parliament, fellow LREM lawmaker Sacha Houlié told Darmanin that "there are no savages in France, there are only citizens".

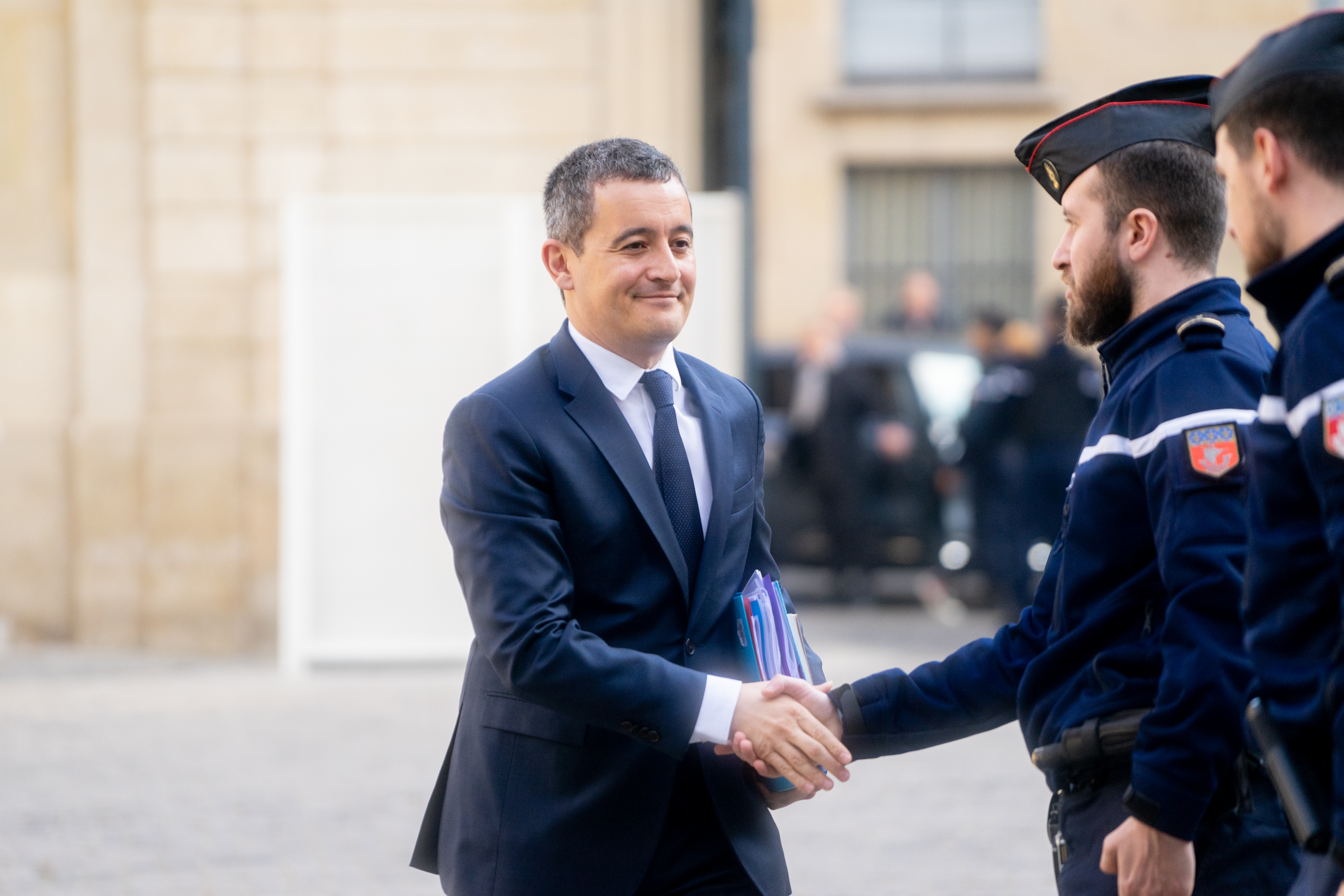
Gérald Darmanin, Minister of Public Action and Accounts (29 April 2019)

=== Comments on religious separatism ===
In October 2020, Darmanin faced criticism for an interview with BFM TV, in which he expressed shock at dedicated aisles in supermarkets for halal and kosher food. He said he had "always been shocked to walk into a supermarket and see that there was an aisle of such [religious] community food", implying that the separate sale of these products can contribute to the isolation of minority communities. In May 2021, when confronted at the National Assembly about the strict security policy his administration had put in place in reaction to an alleged increase in crime rates that was disproven by the National Institute of Statistic and Economic Studies, he said that while he liked to read reports and statistics, he would rather listen to the guts and feelings of his butcher in Tourcoing.

=== Champions League Final controversy ===
On 28 May 2022, the Champions League final at the Stade de France descended into chaos with locals entering the stadium without tickets and robbing and assaulting visiting Liverpool fans, while the police launched tear gas on innocent fans. Darmanin blamed the escalation on alleged ticket counterfeiting by Liverpool fans, an account that was disputed by eyewitnesses including journalists. His statement was strongly condemned by Liverpool and the French left and right wing. Polling found that 76% of the French public did not believe his statement.

In June 2022, whilst giving evidence to a Senate committee, Darmanin said that things could have been better organised and apologised for the "disproportionate" use of tear gas. He maintained Liverpool fans were largely to blame. In July 2022, the Senate committee released a report that condemned Darmanin, saying: "It is unfair to have sought to blame supporters of the Liverpool team for the disturbances, as the interior minister has done, to deflect attention from the state's inability to properly manage the crowd and suppress the action of several hundred violent and organised delinquents."

In May 2025, Darmanin formally apologised to Liverpool supporters for blaming them for the chaos, admitting that fans "were quite right to be hurt. It was a mistake and a failure."

=== Accusations of Corruption with PSG ===
In September 2024, Mediapart claims that the justice system has text messages attesting to Gérald Darmanin's involvement in Paris Saint-Germain's tax affairs.

=== Over handling of cases of sex offenders ===
In June 2026, Darmanin was under fire over handling of justice system due to the death of 11 year-old Lyhanna Rameau Bernard.

== Personal life ==
Darmanin married his second wife, Rose-Marie Devillers, a consultancy director at French communications group Havas, on 29 August 2020. They were introduced to each other by Michel Bettan, executive vice-president of Havas Paris. They have one child, a boy born in 2021. Darmanin is Catholic.

== Awards, honours ==
- Médaille d'or de la jeunesse et des sports (2012)

== Other activities ==
- Member of the board of the Institut d'études politiques de Lille
- President of the DSEM Ville Renouvelée
- President of SMIRT

== Publications ==
- Chroniques de l'ancien monde : Quand la droite s’est perdue, éditions de l'Observatoire, 2017. Récit sur la déroute de la droite à l'élection présidentielle de 2017.
- Le Séparatisme islamiste. Manifeste pour la laïcité, éditions de l'Observatoire, 2021. Ouvrage où il explique les raisons et défend son projet de loi pour les valeurs républicaines.

== Bibliography ==
- Ludovic Vigogne, Paris, Fayard, 3 avril 2019, 192 p. (ISBN 978-2-213-71253-6, OCLC 1100437068)
- Anita Hausser et Jean-François Gintzburger, Paris, l'Archipel, 10 novembre 2021, 192 p. (ISBN 978-2-8098-4096-4, OCLC 1290677587)
- Laurent Valdiguié et François Vignolle, Paris, Robert Laffont, 31 mars 2022, 305 p. (ISBN 978-2-221-25980-1, OCLC 1337026435)
