= Seine-et-Marne's 9th constituency =

Constituency of the National Assembly of France

9th constituency of Seine-et-Marne
- inline Constituency of the National Assembly of France

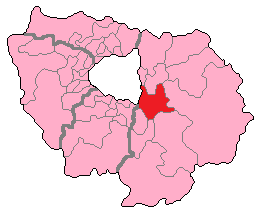
- Seine-et-Marne's 9th Constituency shown within Île-de-France
- Deputy: Céline Thiébault-Martinez; Socialist
- Department: Seine-et-Marne
- Cantons: Brie-Comte-Robert – Pontault-Combault – Tournan-en-Brie – Combs-la-Ville (part)
- Registered voters: 82,227

The 9th constituency of Seine-et-Marne is a French legislative constituency in the Seine-et-Marne department.

== Description ==
The 9th constituency of Seine-et-Marne lies in the centre of the department but borders the so-called Petite Couronne of the inner Paris urban area.

Like its neighbouring seats, 9th has historically swung between left and right. It, however, remained in the hands of the conservative Union for a Popular Movement (UMP) for three consecutive elections from 2002 until 2017.

== Historic representation ==
Election	Member	Party
1986	Proportional representation – no election by constituency	
1988	Alain Vivien	PS
1991	Jacques Heuclin	PS
1993	Jean-Pierre Cognat	RPR
1997	Jacques Heuclin	PS
2002	Guy Geoffroy	UMP
2007	Guy Geoffroy	UMP
2012	Guy Geoffroy	UMP
2017	Michèle Peyron	LREM
2022	Michèle Peyron	RE
2024	Céline Thiébault-Martinez	PS

== Election results ==
=== 2024 ===
Candidate	Party	Alliance	First round			Second round		
Candidate	Party	Alliance	Votes	%	+/–	Votes	%	+/–
Morgann Vanacker	RN		19,781	35.50	+13.59	23,958	46.35	N/A
Céline Thiébault-Martinez	PS	NFP	16,521	29.65	+2.50	27,726	53.65	+6.28
Michèle Peyron	RE	ENS	12,023	21.57	-3.37	WITHDREW		
Franck Denion	LR		3,834	6.88	-4.78			
Marie-Pierre Chevallier	DVE		1,745	3.13	N/A			
Kamal Valcin	DVC		775	1.39	N/A			
Bruno-Charles Delalandre	REC		622	1.12	-3.27			
Florence Woods	LO		425	0.76	+0.07			
Valid votes			55,727	97.78	-0.19	51,684	91.46	-0.50
Blank votes			980	1.72	+0.13	3,915	6.93	+0.88
Null votes			283	0.50	+0.06	911	1.61	-0.38
Turnout			56,990	64.96	+21.71	56,510	64.38	+22.57
Abstentions			30,745	35.04	-21.71	31,263	35.62	-22.57
Registered voters			87,735			87,773		
Source: Ministry of the Interior, Le Monde
Result						PS GAIN FROM RE		

=== 2022 ===
Legislative Election 2022: Seine-et-Marne's 9th constituency
Party	Candidate	Votes	%	±%
LFI (NUPÉS)	Pascal Novais	9,919	27.15	+4.63
LREM (Ensemble)	Michèle Peyron	9,112	24.94	-11.05
RN	Morgann Vanacker	8,004	24.94	+7.66
LR (UDC)	Guy Geoffroy	4,259	11.66	−7.91
REC	Bruno-Charles Delalandre	1,603	4.39	N/A
DVE	Nathalie Maurize	1,196	3.27	N/A
Others	N/A	2,446	6.69	
Turnout		36,539	43.25	+0.04
2nd round result
LREM (Ensemble)	Michèle Peyron	17,454	52.63	-1.64
LFI (NUPÉS)	Pascal Novais	15,709	47.37	N/A
Turnout		33,163	41.81	+8.89
LREM hold				

=== 2017 ===
Legislative Election 2017: Seine-et-Marne's 9th constituency
Party	Candidate	Votes	%	±%
LREM	Michèle Peyron	13,370	35.99	
LR	Guy Geoffroy	7,268	19.57	
FN	Pascal Fiandrin	5,295	14.25	
LFI	Delphine Heuclin	4,709	12.68	
PS	Monique Delessard	2,507	6.75	
EELV	Fernande Trezentos Oliveira	1,147	3.09	
DLF	Pascal Robert	1,004	2.70	
Others	N/A	1,847		
Turnout		37,147	43.21	
2nd round result
LREM	Michèle Peyron	15,361	54.27	
LR	Guy Geoffroy	12,943	45.73	
Turnout		28,304	32.92	
LREM gain from LR				

=== 2012 ===
Legislative Election 2012: Seine-et-Marne's 9th Constituency 2nd round
Party	Candidate	Votes	%	±%
UMP	Guy Geoffroy	21,715	51.22	
PS	Chantal Brunel	20,679	48.78	
Turnout		43.456	52.85	
UMP hold		Swing		

== Sources ==
Official results of French elections from 2002: "Résultats électoraux officiels en France" (in French).
