= Charlotte Lecocq =

French politician

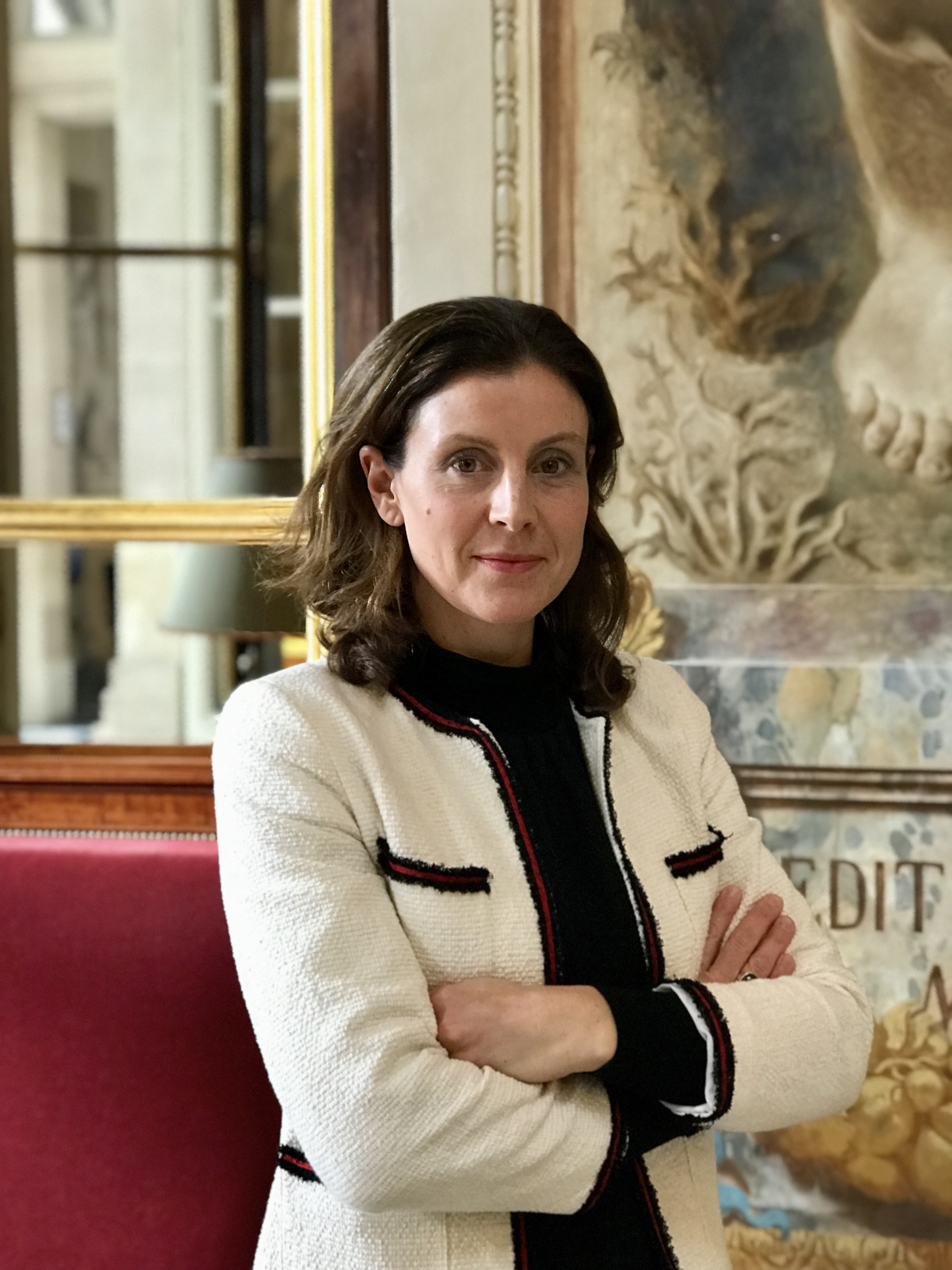

Secretary of State in charge of People with Disabilities
- Incumbent
- Assumed office 21 September 2024
- President: Emmanuel Macron
- Prime Minister: Michel Barnier; François Bayrou; Sébastien Lecornu
- Preceded by: Fadila Khattabi

Member of the National Assembly for Nord's 6th constituency
- In office 21 June 2017 – 21 September 2024
- Preceded by: Thierry Lazaro
- Succeeded by: Jean Moulliere

Personal details
- Born: 17 July 1977 (age 49) Pointe-à-Pitre, Guadeloupe
- Party: La République En Marche!
- Education: IAE Lille

Charlotte Lecocq (born 17 July 1977) is a French politician of La République En Marche! (LREM) who has been serving as Secretary of State in charge of People with Disabilities in the successive governments of Prime Ministers Michel Barnier, François Bayrou and Sébastien Lecornu since 2024. She previously served as a member of the French National Assembly from 2017 to 2024, representing the department of Nord.

== Political career ==
In parliament, Lecocq was a member of the Committee on Social Affairs. In this capacity, she served as rapporteur on occupational safety and health. She first was a candidate to succeed Brigitte Bourguignon as the committee’s chair in 2020 but ultimately lost against Fadila Khattabi; in 2023, she succeeded Khattabi as chair.

In addition to her committee assignments, Lecocq was a member of the French-Venezuelan Parliamentary Friendship Group.

== Political positions ==
In the 2020 French municipal elections, Lecocq endorsed Valérie Petit as LREM’s candidate to become mayor of Lille.

== See also ==
- 2017 French legislative election
