= Côte-d'Or's 3rd constituency =

Constituency of the National Assembly of France

3rd constituency of the Côte-d'Or
- inline Constituency of the National Assembly of France

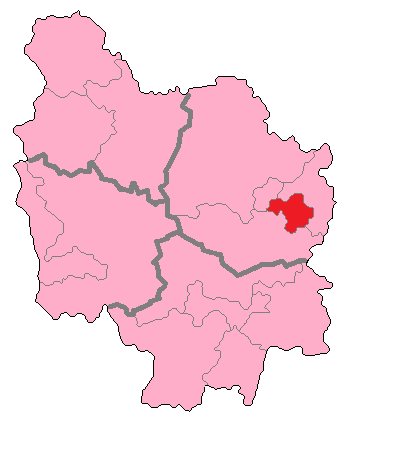
- Côte-d'Or's 3rd Constituency shown within Burgundy
- Deputy: Pierre Pribetich; PS
- Department: Côte-d'Or
- Cantons: Chenôve, Dijon-II, Dijon-IV, Genlis
- Registered voters: 69,194

The 3rd constituency of the Côte-d'Or is a French legislative constituency in the Côte-d'Or département. Like the other 576 French constituencies, it elects one MP using the two-round system.

== Description ==
Côte-d'Or's 3rd constituency is largely urban as it is based around the southern parts of Dijon. It also includes the town of Chenôve, which today forms Dijon's largest suburb.

The seat is the more left leaning of the three constituencies in Côte-d'Or that include parts of Dijon within them.

== Historic Representation ==
Election	Member	Party
1986	Proportional representation – no election by constituency	
1988	Roland Carraz	PS
1993	Lucien Brenot	CNIP
1997	Claude Darciaux	PS
2002	Claude Darciaux	PS
2007	Claude Darciaux	PS
2012	Kheira Bouziane	PS
2017	Fadila Khattabi	LREM
2022	Fadila Khattabi	LREM
2024	Pierre Pribetich	PS

== Election results ==
=== 2024 ===
Candidate	Party	Alliance	First round			Second round		
Candidate	Party	Alliance	Votes	%	+/–	Votes	%	+/–
Thierry Coudert	LR-RN	UXD	17,405	35.44	new	21,645	46.85	new
Pierre Pribetich	PS	NFP	14,532	29.59	+4.21	24,554	53.15	+3.26
Fadila Khattabi	REN	Ensemble	11,695	23.81	-1.84	withdrew		
Charle Bourgadel	LR	UDC	3,611	7.35	-1.06			
Georges Mezui	DIV		1,176	2.39	new			
Fabienne Delorme	LO		694	1.41	+0.47			
Votes			49,113	100.00		46,199	100.00	
Valid votes			49,113	97.53	-0.32	46,199	91.33	+0.99
Blank votes			927	1.84	+0.20	3,566	7.05	-0.21
Null votes			319	0.63	+0.12	821	1.62	-0.79
Turnout			50,359	69.53	+21.74	50,586	69.82	+24.46
Abstentions			22,067	30.47	-21.74	21,866	30.18	-24.46
Registered voters			72,426			72,452		
Result			PS GAIN FROM RE					

=== 2022 ===
Legislative Election 2022: Côte-d'Or's 3rd constituency
Party	Candidate	Votes	%	±%
LREM (Ensemble)	Fadila Khattabi	8,701	25.65	-6.36
LFI (NUPÉS)	Patricia Marc	8,610	25.38	+1.86
RN	Dominique-Alexandre Bourgois	7,704	22.71	+5.48
LR (UDC)	Valérie Grandet	2,853	8.41	−6.27
PS	Xavier Richard*	1,539	4.54	N/A
REC	Solène Lacroix-Samper	1,419	4.18	N/A
DVE	Bruno Louis	904	2.66	N/A
FGR	Clément Van Melckebeke	839	2.47	N/A
Others	N/A	1,354	-	−
Turnout		33,923	47.79	−0.93
2nd round result
LREM (Ensemble)	Fadila Khattabi	14,900	50.11	-15.20
LFI (NUPÉS)	Patricia Marc	14,834	49.89	N/A
Turnout		29,734	45.36	+2.20
LREM hold				

* Richard stood as a PS dissident, without the support of the party or the NUPES alliance.

=== 2017 ===
Candidate	Label	First round		Second round	
Candidate	Label	Votes	%	Votes	%
Fadila Khattabi	REM	10,766	32.01	17,553	65.31
Jean-François Bathelier	FN	5,795	17.23	9,323	34.69
Pascale Caravel	LR	4,936	14.68		
Boris Obama	FI	4,238	12.60		
Kheira Bouziane-Laroussi	DVG	3,032	9.01		
Anne Dillenseger-Sebti	PS	2,016	5.99		
Michel Procureur	ECO	1,088	3.23		
Isabelle de Almeida	PCF	571	1.70		
Dominique Mauri	ECO	415	1.23		
Christine Schenk	DIV	268	0.80		
Stéphane Pournin	EXG	260	0.77		
Dominique Gros	EXG	124	0.37		
Yilmaz Çelik	DIV	87	0.26		
Khaled Ben Letaïef	DIV	37	0.11		
Lucas Maitrot	DVG	0	0.00		
Votes		33,633	100.00	26,876	100.00
Valid votes		33,633	98.01	26,876	88.40
Blank votes		533	1.55	2,726	8.97
Null votes		150	0.44	800	2.63
Turnout		34,316	48.72	30,402	43.16
Abstentions		36,125	51.28	40,039	56.84
Registered voters		70,441		70,441	
Source: Ministry of the Interior

=== 2012 ===
2012 legislative election in Cote-D'Or's 3rd constituency
Candidate	Party	First round		Second round	
Candidate	Party	Votes	%	Votes	%
Kheira Bouziane	PS	15,058	37.98%	19,944	53.05%
Pascale Caravel	UMP	10,788	27.21%	17,654	46.95%
Sylvie Ruelloux	FN	6,402	16.15%		
Isabelle De Almeida	FG	2,620	6.61%		
Jean-Philippe Morel	PR	1,481	3.74%		
Isabelle Loos-Maillard	MoDem	1,240	3.13%		
Bruno Louis	EELV	1,140	2.88%		
Dominique Mauri	AEI	355	0.90%		
Stéphane Pournin	LO	252	0.64%		
Danièle Patinet-Hollinger	NPA	179	0.45%		
Jean Trebuchet	SP	135	0.34%		
Valid votes		39,650	98.73%	37,598	96.73%
Spoilt and null votes		511	1.27%	1,272	3.27%
Votes cast / turnout		40,161	58.04%	38,870	56.18%
Abstentions		29,029	41.96%	30,313	43.82%
Registered voters		69,190	100.00%	69,183	100.00%

=== 2007 ===
Legislative Election 2007: Côte-d'Or's 3rd constituency
Party	Candidate	Votes	%	±%
UMP	Anne-Marie Beaudouvi	15,192	38.78	+2.14
PS	Claude Darciaux	13,728	35.04	+1.24
MoDem	François Deseille	2,794	7.13	N/A
FN	Rémy Boursot	1,906	4.87	−9.27
LV	Stéphanie Modde	1,428	3.65	+0.61
EXG	Danièle Patinet	921	2.35	N/A
PCF	Isabelle De Almeida	918	2.34	N/A
Others	N/A	2,288	-	−
Turnout		39,827	58.01	−5.65
2nd round result
PS	Claude Darciaux	21,250	53.26	+2.58
UMP	Anne-Marie Beaudouvi	18,646	46.74	−2.58
Turnout		40,851	59.51	+1.12
PS hold				

=== 2002 ===
Legislative Election 2002: Côte-d'Or's 3rd constituency
Party	Candidate	Votes	%	±%
UMP	Lucien Brenot	14,499	36.64	N/A
PS	Claude Darciaux	13,375	33.80	N/A
FN	Charles Cavin	5,597	14.14	−8.50
PR	Thierry Falconnet	1,800	4.55	−26.68
LV	Patrick Saunié	1,203	3.04	−2.42
Others	N/A	3,097	-	−
Turnout		40,323	63.66	−4.29
2nd round result
PS	Claude Darciaux	18,096	50.68	N/A
UMP	Lucien Brenot	17,612	49.32	N/A
Turnout		36,966	58.39	−13.65
PS gain from MDC				

=== 1997 ===
Legislative Election 1997: Côte-d'Or's 3rd constituency
Party	Candidate	Votes	%	±%
MDC	Roland Carraz	12,389	31.23	
LDI	Lucien Brenot	10,636	26.81	
FN	Charles Cavin	8,980	22.64	
PCF	Isabelle De Almeida	2,488	6.27	
LV	Patrick Saunie	2,167	5.46	
MEI	Alexandre Jurado	997	2.51	
LO	Monique Nyang	964	2.43	
LCR	Danielle Patinet	580	1.46	
PT	Alain Bony	471	1.19	
Turnout		41,581	67.95	
2nd round result
MDC	Roland Carraz	22,046	53.64	
LDI	Lucien Brenot	19,053	46.36	
Turnout		44,080	72.04	
MDC gain from LDI				
