= Social Affairs Committee (French National Assembly) =

Standing committee of the French National Assembly

The Social Affairs Committee (French: Commission des Affaires sociales) is one of the eight standing committees of the French National Assembly.

== Chairwomen ==
15th legislature of the French Fifth Republic

- Brigitte Bourguignon (2018 to 2020)
- Fadila Khattabi (2020 to 2023)
- Charlotte Lecocq (since 2023)
