= Thierry Lazaro =

French politician

Lazaro in 2017

Thierry Lazaro (born September 27, 1960) is a French politician. He was a member of the National Assembly of France, representing Nord's 6th constituency from 1993 to 2017, as a member of the Union for a Popular Movement.
