= Claude Darciaux =

French politician

Claude Darciaux (born 18 October 1942) was a member of the National Assembly of France. She represented Côte-d'Or's 3rd constituency, from 1997 to 2012 as a member of the Socialiste, radical, citoyen et divers gauche.
