= Agence nationale des techniques d'enquêtes numériques judiciaires =

French Ministry of Justice agency

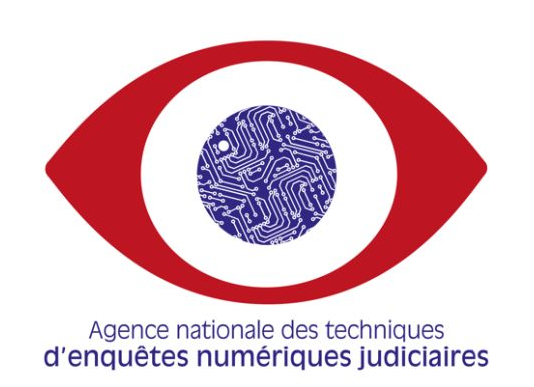

Agency overview
- Formed: 2017
- Preceding agency: Ministerial delegation for judicial interceptions (DIJ)
- Jurisdiction: French Government
- Headquarters: Paris
- Minister responsible: French Ministry of Justice
- Agency executive: Jean-Julien Xavier-Rolai

National Agency for Digital Forensic Investigation Techniques (French: Agence nationale des techniques d'enquêtes numériques judiciaires or ANTENJ) is a national agency attached to the French Ministry of Justice.

In particular, it is in charge of operating the National platform for judicial interceptions (French: Plateforme nationale des interceptions judiciaires or PNIJ). It centralizes telephone tapping and other investigative techniques (relating to wiretapping, geolocation or connection data, now present in 85% of criminal investigations.) ANTENJ covers 92% of judicial interceptions carried out in France.

It is the judicial equivalent of the Interministerial Control Group (French: Groupement interministériel de contrôle or GIC), responsible for interceptions on behalf of the intelligence services.

== History ==
=== Creation of the National platform for judicial interceptions (PNIJ) ===
==== Centralization of judicial interception activities ====
Interceptions can involve 100 million intercepted SMS messages and an average of 10,000 simultaneously tapped lines. Until the early 2010s, the investigative services that needed to intercept communications individually rented a central listening device from private-sector companies. At the time, France had over 350 phonetapping centers, equipped with equipment leased without competitive tendering Four companies (Elektron, Foretec, SGME and Midi System & Co) carried out 88% of interceptions. Response times to interception requests were long (from several hours to several days). This practice encouraged abuses that the magistrate in charge of the investigation could not control (eavesdropping or requests for illegal data), and had a significant cost for the Ministry of Justice.

Planned as far back as 2005, the centralization of wiretapping within a dedicated government department has led to the creation of the National platform for judicial interceptions (French: Plateforme nationale des interceptions judiciaires or PNIJ). It is intended to replace the use of private operators. The four SMEs involved went so far as to cease interception in protest.

The PNIJ is to use a single IT system to carry out telephone tapping, obtain itemized invoices, and monitor MMS, SMS and geolocation devices. The platform is expected to pay for itself within two years, saving 130 civil servant posts. It will initially be overseen by the Delegation for judicial interceptions of the Chancellery It was housed at Place Vendôme in Paris and was the forerunner of ANTENJ. The technical design of the platform was entrusted to the manufacturer Thales, who housed the system in a secure bunker in Élancourt (Yvelines). It will eventually be transferred to two sites belonging to the Ministries of Justice and the Interior.

==== The difficulties of deploying the PNIJ ====
The production and deployment of the PNIJ are the subject of considerable criticism, linked to delays and technical difficulties. The design was launched in 2009 (under the ministry of Rachida Dati) with the Thales group, thanks to a contract that was under-dimensioned at the time. The project was tested in Paris, Versailles and Rouen PNIJ was officially deployed by Decree no. 2014-1162 of October 9, 2014. It establishes articles R. 40–42 to R. 40-56 of the Code of Criminal Procedure.

In 2017, the platform is still not operational. Police unions are calling its lack of efficiency a "state scandal". Its use would be an "administrative nightmare and a gas factory" for forensic investigators. The response time to an interception request - once several hours or days - has been cut to less than three minutes, but the platform is prone to breakdowns. These hinder the progress of investigations and totalled around 400 unresolved bugs in June 2014. Police and magistrates' unions are calling for a parliamentary commission of inquiry or for the system to be overhauled by the manufacturer Thales. Several audits were carried out under the government of Manuel Valls. They are protected by defense secrecy.

In 2016, the French Cour des Comptes reported that the PNIJ was expected to cost 17 million euros when it went live in 2008. It was only partially commissioned in 2015, at a cost ten times higher (102.7 million euros.) However, the government does not wish to return to private-sector solutions. It prefers to consider internalizing the platform to reduce its dependence on Thales, as recommended by the Cour des Comptes.

=== Creation of the National Agency for Digital Forensic Investigation Techniques (ANTENJ) ===
In its report, the Cour des Comptes calls for a strengthening of the DIJ, an extension of its competencies and a stronger regulatory foundation. In order to improve the steering of the PNIJ and the effectiveness of new digital investigation techniques, ANTENJ was created by a decree dated April 24, 2017. It replaces the DIJ. It benefits from the support of the intelligence community and, in 2018, has around forty agents: they must contribute to the emergence of a "new generation" IT system. The various departments that use the PNIJ are represented on the teams to ensure that their needs are taken into account.

ANTENJ has a budget of 54.7 million euros for 2025, including 16.8 million euros for investment.

==== Mandatory use of ANTENJ's tools since 2016 ====
Since the law of June 3, 2016, the Code of Criminal Procedure has required criminal investigation departments to use PNIJ (unless technically impossible). The French Supreme Court (Cour de cassation) rules that recourse to private operators is now impossible, unless ANTENJ is unable to provide the requested service.

==== Rehabilitation of PNIJ and development of ANTENJ's role ====
In 2020, the French Court of Auditors rehabilitated the PNIJ, stating that the Platform had now "fulfilled the main objectives set for it"; it presented the project as "a successful example of how to turn around a project in a crisis situation"; it emphasized the Agency's role in overcoming the crisis, and estimated that ANTENJ made it possible to "halve the cost of an interception" and save the public purse almost 30 million euros a year. In the press, investigators and judges highlight the progress made since the creation of ANTENJ. A senatorial report notes "the smooth operation of the tool, which is now praised by all departments".

In 2022, over 46,000 judicial interceptions and 2.9 million electronic requisitions were requested via the PNIJ. It will become fully operational in 2024. Its final cost is estimated at 385 million euros. In 2024, it will provide services to almost 70,000 magistrates and investigators. Almost all Gendarmerie Nationale investigators use the system.

==== Agency developments ====
Big Data processing modules will be under development in 2023.

In November 2024, the French Minister of Justice Didier Migaud, as part of his plan to combat organized crime, recommended strengthening the ANTENJ's geolocation, interception and sonorisation capabilities.

In November 2024, a report on organized crime by former national anti-terrorist prosecutor stated that ANTENJ was to be transformed into a true "cyber command" of the Ministry of Justice.

== How it works ==
=== Missions ===
ANTENJ's role is to provide judges (and the investigators under their authority) with the means to carry out investigations without being hampered by technological developments. Its missions are partly classified. According to the Ministry of Justice, the Agency coordinates the State's efforts in the field of judicial electronic communications interception, and in this context :

- Oversees and manages the PNIJ project;
- Coordinates, on behalf of the Ministry of Justice, the implementation of digital investigation techniques in legal proceedings. It is involved in the drafting of related texts and procedures;
- Ensures awareness-raising and training, as well as technological and legal monitoring.

=== Agency Management ===
ANTENJ is headed by a magistrate. Between 2017 and 2020, the Agency will be headed by Damien Martinelli, former advisor to Prime Minister Bernard Cazeneuve.

Since 2020, its director has been Jean-Julien Xavier-Rolai, also a former advisor to the Prime Minister and to the National Intelligence Coordinator, specializing in counter-terrorism, intelligence and the fight against organized crime.

=== Supervisory Board ===
The laws establishing ANTENJ and PNIJ set up a committee to monitor the use of digital investigation techniques. This committee is intended to respond to the fears raised by the use of surveillance methods that infringe on civil liberties and are operated by ANTENJ. The committee is made up of a magistrate from the French Supreme Court (Cour de cassation), two members of parliament and two qualified experts. The first committee was set up in November 2016 by Justice Minister Jean-Jacques Urvoas.

=== Well-known interdepartmental relations ===
ANTENJ works in cooperation with several government departments under the responsibility of other ministries or the Prime Minister, particularly the French intelligence services such as the Directorate-General for External Security (DGSE) or the Directorate-General for Internal Security (DGSI). It also works with the Groupement interministériel de contrôle and the French cybersecurity agency (ANSSI), both reporting to the French Prime Minister.
