= Fadila Khattabi =

French politician (born 1962)

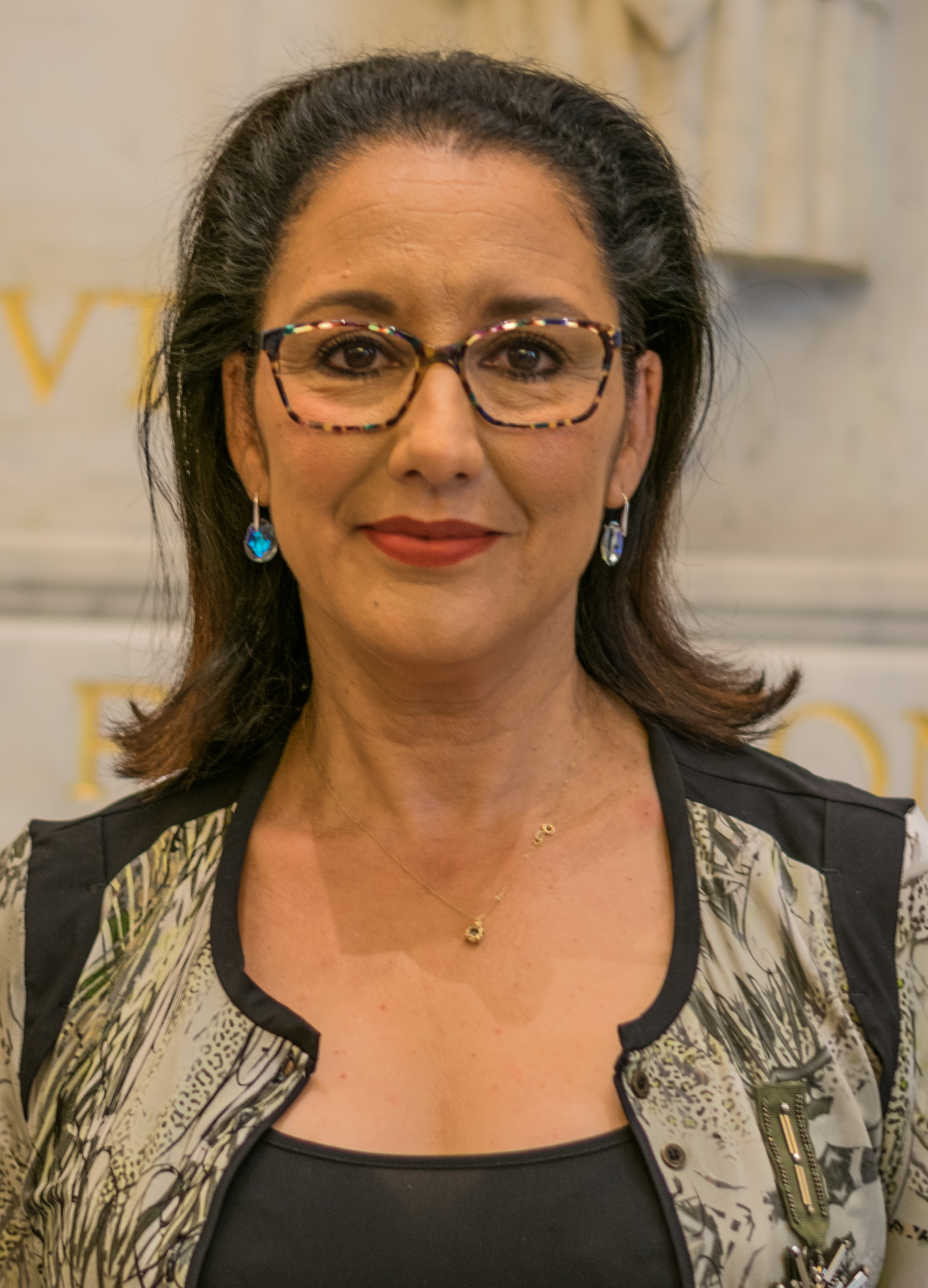

Secretary of State in charge of People with Disabilities
- In office 20 July 2023 – 21 September 2024
- President: Emmanuel Macron
- Prime Minister: Élisabeth Borne; Gabriel Attal
- Preceded by: Geneviève Darrieussecq
- Succeeded by: Charlotte Lecocq

President of the Social Affairs Committee
- In office 22 July 2020 – 20 July 2023
- Preceded by: Brigitte Bourguignon
- Succeeded by: Charlotte Lecocq

Member of the National Assembly for Côte-d'Or's 3rd constituency
- In office 21 June 2017 – 20 July 2023
- Preceded by: Kheira Bouziane
- Succeeded by: Phillipe Frei

Member of the Regional council of Burgundy
- In office 2004–2015

Personal details
- Born: 23 February 1962 (age 64) Montbéliard, France
- Party: Renaissance
- Education: University of Burgundy
- Occupation: English teacher

Fadila Khattabi (born 23 February 1962) is a French politician of Renaissance (RE) who served as Secretary of State in charge of People with Disabilities in the government of successive Prime Ministers Élisabeth Borne and Gabriel Attal from 2023 to 2024. She was a member of the French National Assembly from the 2017 elections, representing Côte-d'Or.

== Early life ==
Khattabi was born in Montbéliard and is the daughter of Algerian immigrants. She studied English in Dijon, and later became an English teacher.

== Political career ==
=== Career in local politics ===
Khattabi was elected to the Burgundy Regional Council in 2004 and was re-elected in 2010.

Khattabi stepped down from politics in 2015 during the regional elections, after trying to mount a dissident socialist list associated with the MoDem.

=== Member of the National Assembly, 2017–2023 ===
On 24 May 2017 Khattabi launched her campaign for the National Assembly for La République En Marche! She came first in the first round of the ballot, garnering 32% of the votes. She also won in the second round, earning 65.32% of the votes, defeating her National Front opponent Jean-François Bathelier. She was elected to the French National Assembly on 18 June 2017. She was re-elected in the 2022 French legislative election.

In the National Assembly, Khattabi sat on the Committee on Social Affairs, which she chaired from 2020 to 2023. She was the President of the France-Algeria Friendship Group.

== See also ==
- 2017 French legislative election
