= Nord's 6th constituency =

Constituency of the National Assembly of France

6th constituency of the Nord
- inline Constituency of the National Assembly of France

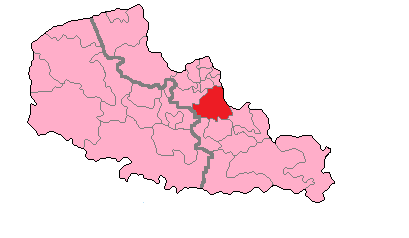
- Nord's 6th Constituency shown within Nord-Pas-de-Calais
- Deputy: Charlotte Lecocq; RE
- Department: Nord
- Cantons: Cysoing, Orchies, Pont-à-Marcq, d'Anstaing, Baisieux, Chéreng, Forest-sur-Marque, Gruson, Sailly-lez-Lannoy, Tressin et Willems
- Registered voters: 84,777

The 6th constituency of the Nord is a French legislative constituency in the Nord département.

== Description ==
Nord's 6th constituency lies in the centre of the department and reaches both its northern border with Belgium and its southern border with Pas-de-Calais. It covers the largely rural areas between Lille and Valenciennes.

Historically the seat has swung between left and right, however from 1993 to 2017 it was held continuously by the Gaullist Thierry Lazaro.

== Historic Representation ==
Election	Member	Party
1958	Eugene Van Der Meersch	UNR
1962	Marceau Laurent	FDGS
1967	Marceau Laurent	FDGS
1968	Robert Vandelanoitte	UDR
1973	André Laurent	PS
1978	André Laurent	PS
1981	André Laurent	PS
1986	Proportional representation - no election by constituency	
1988	Robert Anselin	PS
1993	Thierry Lazaro	RPR
1997	Thierry Lazaro	RPR
2002	Thierry Lazaro	UMP
2007	Thierry Lazaro	UMP
2012	Thierry Lazaro	UMP
2017	Charlotte Lecocq	LREM
2022	Charlotte Lecocq	RE

== Election results ==
=== 2024 ===
Legislative Election 2024: Nord's 6th constituency
Party	Candidate	Votes	%	±%
LFI (NFP)	Célia Pereira	13,243	19.53	−0.41
LR	Jimi Erotico	4,265	6.29	−7.88
RE (Ensemble)	Charlotte Parmentier-Lecocq	25,831	38.09	+4.49
LR (UXD)	Marie-Hélène Quatreboeufs	23,781	35.07	+20.90
LO	Frédéric Barrez	687	1.01	N/A
Turnout		67,807	97.68	+44.98
Registered electors		95,058		
2nd round result
RE	Charlotte Parmentier-Lecocq	39,467	60.31	+22.22
LR	Marie-Hélène Quatreboeufs	25,978	39.69	+4.62
Turnout		65,445	95.85	−1.83
Registered electors		95,049		
RE hold		Swing		

=== 2022 ===
Legislative Election 2022: Nord's 6th constituency
Party	Candidate	Votes	%	±%
LREM (Ensemble)	Charlotte Parmentier-Lecocq	16,307	33.60	-4.43
LFI (NUPÉS)	Célia Pereira	9,679	19.94	+4.71
RN	Virginie Fenain	9,614	19.81	+4.97
LR (UDC)	Luc Foutry	6,876	14.17	−8.96
REC	André Demeester	1,682	3.47	N/A
PRG	Maryse Faber-Rossi	1,269	2.61	−0.37
PA	Vanessa Labre	1,260	2.60	N/A
LMR	Thierry Rolland	1,011	2.08	N/A
Others	N/A	836	1.72	
Turnout		48,534	52.70	−1.21
2nd round result
LREM (Ensemble)	Charlotte Parmentier-Lecocq	27,387	63.07	+11.25
LFI (NUPÉS)	Célia Pereira	16,037	36.93	N/A
Turnout		43,424	50.54	+3.17
LREM hold				

=== 2017 ===
Candidate	Label	First round		Second round	
Candidate	Label	Votes	%	Votes	%
Charlotte Lecocq	REM	17,932	38.03	19,739	51.82
Thierry Lazaro	LR	10,905	23.13	18,354	48.18
Éric Cattelin-Denu	FN	6,999	14.84		
Amandine Fouillard	FI	4,638	9.84		
Maryse Faber-Rossi	ECO	1,540	3.27		
Didier Chastanet	PRG	1,406	2.98		
Romain Sarels	DVD	1,228	2.60		
Nadine Savary-Canteloup	PCF	1,001	2.12		
Isabelle Colas	ECO	539	1.14		
Léa Demory	EXG	376	0.80		
Anne Lefèvre	DIV	317	0.67		
Jean-Marc Gérard	DIV	255	0.54		
Agnès Lefebvre	DVD	20	0.04		
Votes		47,156	100.00	38,093	100.00
Valid votes		47,156	98.17	38,093	90.25
Blank votes		618	1.29	2,789	6.61
Null votes		261	0.54	1,324	3.14
Turnout		48,035	53.91	42,206	47.37
Abstentions		41,072	46.09	46,899	52.63
Registered voters		89,107		89,105	
Source: Ministry of the Interior

=== 2012 ===
Legislative Election 2012: Nord's 6th constituency
Party	Candidate	Votes	%	±%
UMP	Thierry Lazaro	17,165	33.02	−14.54
PS	Angélique Deffontaine	15,979	30.74	+4.18
FN	Annie Lemahieu	7,559	14.54	+9.43
DVD	Luc Monnet	6,155	11.84	N/A
FG	Nadine Savary	2,657	5.11	+1.98
EELV	Maryse Faber-Rossi	1,275	2.45	−0.24
Others	N/A	1,197		
Turnout		51,987	61.32	−3.85
2nd round result
UMP	Thierry Lazaro	27,050	54.98	−1.62
PS	Angélique Deffontaine	22,148	45.02	+1.62
Turnout		49,198	58.03	−5.82
UMP hold				

=== 2007 ===
Legislative Election 2007: Nord's 6th constituency
Party	Candidate	Votes	%	±%
UMP	Thierry Lazaro	24,711	47.56	+3.63
PS	Dominique Bailly	13,799	26.56	−2.09
MoDem	Alain Duchesne	4,390	8.45	N/A
FN	Laurence Monteil	2,654	5.11	−6.87
PCF	Nadine Savary	1,629	3.13	+0.11
LV	Maryse Faber-Rossi	1,396	2.69	+0.52
Far left	Sarah Sardou	1,059	2.04	N/A
Others	N/A	2,324		
Turnout		52,806	65.17	−2.57
2nd round result
UMP	Thierry Lazaro	28,363	56.60	−1.01
PS	Dominique Bailly	21,745	43.40	+1.01
Turnout		51,734	63.85	−0.96
UMP hold				

=== 2002 ===
Legislative Election 2002: Nord's 6th constituency
Party	Candidate	Votes	%	±%
UMP	Thierry Lazaro	22,390	43.93	+11.27
PS	Dominique Bailly	14,605	28.65	+1.25
FN	Roselyne Crowin	6,105	11.98	−3.01
PCF	Lea Demory	1,541	3.02	−6.08
CPNT	Vincent Boitez	1,203	2.36	N/A
LV	Maryse Faber-Rossi	1,105	2.17	−1.77
Others	N/A	4,022		
Turnout		52,119	67.74	−7.17
2nd round result
UMP	Thierry Lazaro	27,632	57.61	+7.51
PS	Dominique Bailly	20,329	42.39	−7.51
Turnout		49,871	64.81	−12.78
UMP hold				

=== 1997 ===
Legislative Election 1997: Nord's 6th constituency
Party	Candidate	Votes	%	±%
RPR	Thierry Lazaro	16,422	32.66	
PS	Dominique Bailly	13,776	27.40	
FN	Christian Grenier	7,535	14.99	
PCF	Jacques Roillet	4,576	9.10	
LV	Maryse Faber-Rossi	1,983	3.94	
DVD	Françoise de Villepoix	1,915	3.81	
DVE	Brigitte Colin	1,036	2.06	
DIV	Jacques Vileghe	1,019	2.03	
Others	N/A	2,013		
Turnout		53,096	74.91	
2nd round result
RPR	Thierry Lazaro	26,013	50.10	
PS	Dominique Bailly	25,908	49.90	
Turnout		54,987	77.59	
RPR hold				

== Sources ==
- Official results of French elections from 1998: "Résultats électoraux officiels en France" (in French).
