= Roubaix =

Commune in Hauts-de-France, France

Roubaix: Roboais (West Flemish); Roubés (Picard); Robaais (Dutch)
- Commune
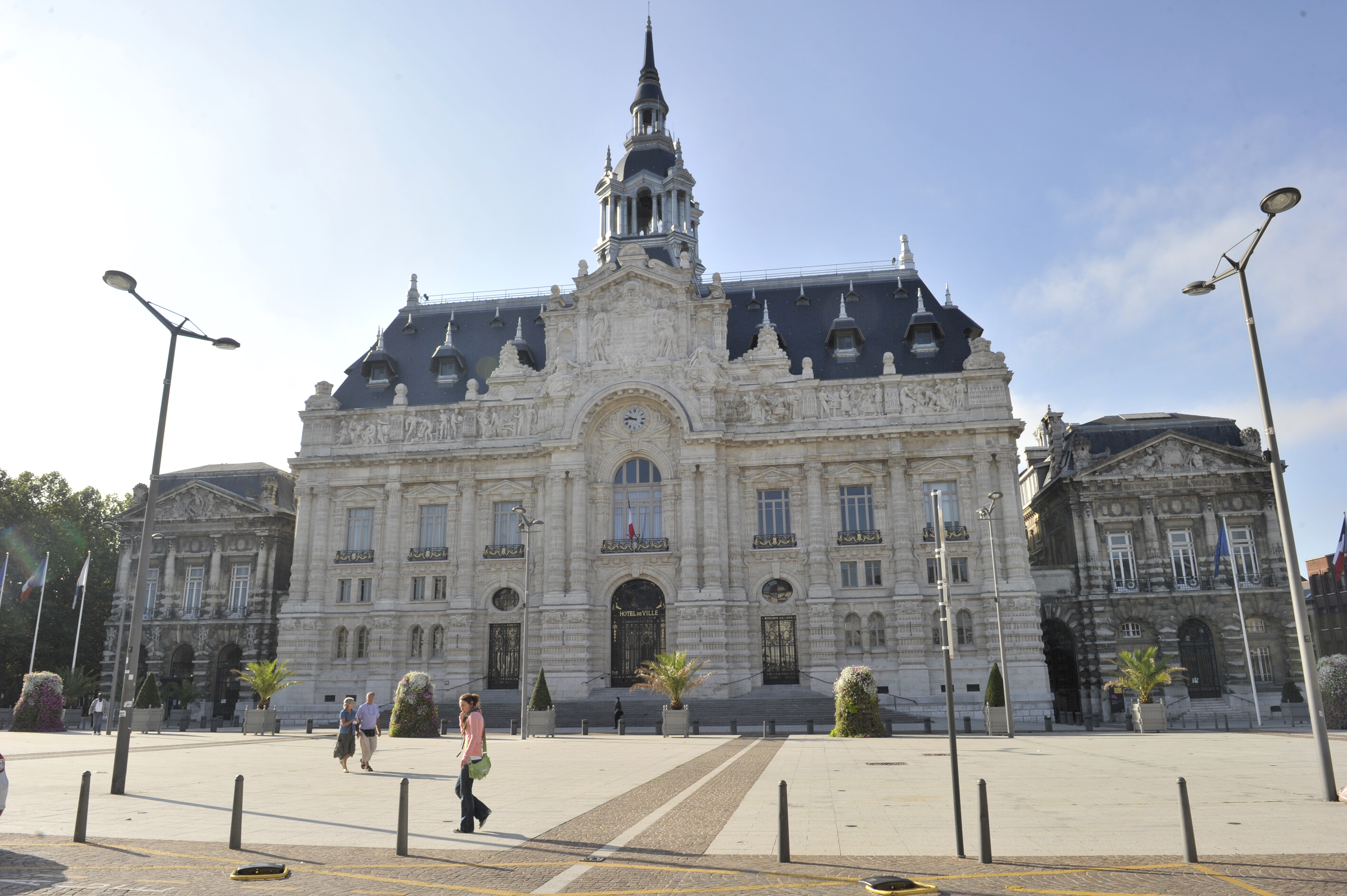
- The Hôtel de Ville (City Hall)

- Coat of arms
- Motto: Probitas et Industria
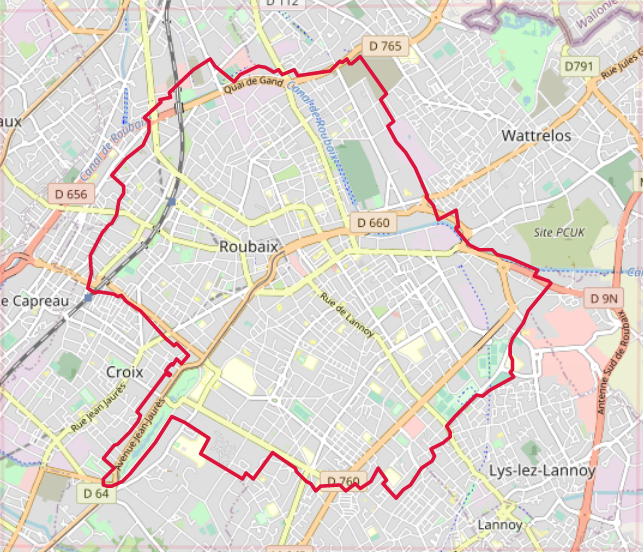
- Location of Roubaix
- Location within France Location within Hauts-de-France
- Coordinates: 50°41′24″N 3°10′54″E
- Country: France
- Region: Hauts-de-France
- Department: Nord
- Arrondissement: Lille
- Canton: Roubaix-1 and Roubaix-2
- Intercommunality: Métropole Européenne de Lille

Government
  - Mayor (2026–32): David Guiraud
- Area^{1}: 13.23 km^{2} (5.11 sq mi)
- Elevation: 35 m (115 ft)
- Highest elevation: 52 m (171 ft)
- Lowest elevation: 17 m (56 ft)
- Population (2023): 98,286
  - Density: 7,429/km^{2} (19,240/sq mi)
- Demonym(s): Roubaisian (en); Roubaisien(ne) (fr)
- Time zone: UTC+01:00 (CET)
  - Summer (DST): UTC+02:00 (CEST)
- INSEE/Postal code: 59512 /59100
- Website: www.ville-roubaix.fr (in French)
- ^{1} French Land Register data, which excludes lakes, ponds, glaciers > 1 km^{2} (0.386 sq mi or 247 acres) and river estuaries.

Roubaix (US: /ruːˈbeɪ/ roo-BAY, French: [ʁubɛ] or [ʁube]; Dutch: Robaais; West Flemish: Roboais; Picard: Roubés) is a city in northern France, located in the Lille metropolitan area on the Belgian border. It is a historically mono-industrial commune in the Nord department, which grew rapidly in the 19th century from its textile industries, with most of the same characteristic features as those of English and American boom towns. Roubaix has faced many challenges linked to deindustrialisation such as urban decay, with their related economic and social implications, since its major industries fell into decline by the middle of the 1970s. Located to the northeast of Lille, adjacent to Tourcoing, Roubaix is the chef-lieu of two cantons and the fourth largest city in the French region of Hauts-de-France ranked by population with about 98,000 inhabitants.

Together with the nearby cities of Lille, Tourcoing, Villeneuve-d'Ascq and eighty-six other communes, Roubaix gives structure to a four-centred metropolitan area inhabited by more than 1.1 million people: the European Metropolis of Lille. To a greater extent, Roubaix is in the center of a vast conurbation formed with the Belgian cities of Mouscron, Kortrijk and Tournai, which gave birth to the first European Grouping of Territorial Cooperation in January 2008, Lille–Kortrijk–Tournai with an aggregate population of over 2 million inhabitants.

== Geography ==
=== Location ===
Roubaix occupies a central position on the north-east slope of the Métropole Européenne de Lille: it is set on the eastern side of Lille and the southern side of Tourcoing, close to the Belgian border. As regards towns' boundaries, Roubaix is encompassed by seven cities which constitute its immediate neighbouring environment. These municipalities are namely: Tourcoing to the north and the northwest, Wattrelos to the northeast, Leers to the east, Lys-lez-Lannoy to the southeast, Hem to the south and Croix to the southwest and the west. Roubaix, alongside those municipalities and twenty-one other communes, belongs to the land of Ferrain, a little district of the former Castellany of Lille between the Lys and Scheldt rivers.

As the crow flies, the distance between Roubaix and the following cities is approximately: 16 kilometres (9.9 mi) to Tournai, 18 kilometres (11 mi) to Kortrijk, 84 kilometres (52 mi) to Brussels and 213 kilometres (132 mi) to Paris.

=== Geology ===
The land upon which Roubaix stands belongs to the plain of Flanders. The Roubaisian area stretches on an east-west oriented shallow syncline axis which trends south-southeast to the Paleozoic limestone of the Mélantois-Tournaisis faulted anticline. It consists predominantly of Holocene alluvial sediment depositions. It is flat and low, with an elevation drop of only 35 m (114 ft 10 in) over its 13.23 square kilometres (5.11 sq mi). The lowest altitude of this area stands at 17 m (55 ft 9 1/2 in), while its highest altitude is 52 m (170 ft 7 in) meters above the sea level.

=== Hydrology ===
The Trichon stream fed by waters of the Espierre stream used to flow through the rural landscape of Roubaix before the industrialisation process began to alter this area in the middle of the 19th century. From that century on, the ensuing industries, with their increasing needs for reliable supplies of goods and water, led to the building of an inland waterway connected upstream from the Deûle and downstream to the Marque and Espierre toward the Scheldt, which linked directly Roubaix to Lille.

Opened in 1877, the Canal de Roubaix crosses the town from its northern neighbourhoods to its eastern neighbourhoods and partially flows along the city's boundaries. The Canal de Roubaix closed in 1985, after more than a century in use. Thank to the European funded project Blue Links, the waterway has been reopened to boating traffic since 2011.

=== Climate ===
The area of the city is not known for undergoing unusual weather events. In regard to the town's geographical location and the results of the Météo-France's weather station of Lille-Lesquin, Roubaix is a temperate oceanic climate: while summer experiences mild temperatures, winter's temperatures may fall to below zero. Precipitation is infrequently intense.

Climate data for Roubaix (1981−2010 normals, extremes 1965−present)
| Month | Jan | Feb | Mar | Apr | May | Jun | Jul | Aug | Sep | Oct | Nov | Dec | Year |
|---|---|---|---|---|---|---|---|---|---|---|---|---|---|
| Record high °C (°F) | 15.5 (59.9) | 19.2 (66.6) | 25.5 (77.9) | 28.5 (83.3) | 33.0 (91.4) | 35.1 (95.2) | 42.1 (107.8) | 37.5 (99.5) | 35.5 (95.9) | 28.0 (82.4) | 20.1 (68.2) | 15.5 (59.9) | 42.1 (107.8) |
| Mean daily maximum °C (°F) | 6.7 (44.1) | 7.5 (45.5) | 11.1 (52.0) | 14.7 (58.5) | 18.7 (65.7) | 21.3 (70.3) | 23.8 (74.8) | 23.9 (75.0) | 20.2 (68.4) | 15.6 (60.1) | 10.5 (50.9) | 7.2 (45.0) | 15.1 (59.2) |
| Daily mean °C (°F) | 4.1 (39.4) | 4.5 (40.1) | 7.4 (45.3) | 10.1 (50.2) | 13.9 (57.0) | 16.6 (61.9) | 18.9 (66.0) | 18.9 (66.0) | 15.7 (60.3) | 11.9 (53.4) | 7.7 (45.9) | 4.8 (40.6) | 11.2 (52.2) |
| Mean daily minimum °C (°F) | 1.6 (34.9) | 1.5 (34.7) | 3.7 (38.7) | 5.5 (41.9) | 9.2 (48.6) | 11.9 (53.4) | 14.0 (57.2) | 13.9 (57.0) | 11.2 (52.2) | 8.2 (46.8) | 4.8 (40.6) | 2.4 (36.3) | 7.4 (45.3) |
| Record low °C (°F) | −14.5 (5.9) | −12.5 (9.5) | −7.5 (18.5) | −2.5 (27.5) | −1.0 (30.2) | 3.0 (37.4) | 5.0 (41.0) | 5.0 (41.0) | 3.0 (37.4) | −3.5 (25.7) | −7.0 (19.4) | −10.5 (13.1) | −14.5 (5.9) |
| Average precipitation mm (inches) | 69.8 (2.75) | 54.6 (2.15) | 63.9 (2.52) | 53.3 (2.10) | 67.8 (2.67) | 71.6 (2.82) | 74.2 (2.92) | 70.0 (2.76) | 68.0 (2.68) | 77.1 (3.04) | 81.5 (3.21) | 81.4 (3.20) | 833.2 (32.80) |
| Average precipitation days (≥ 1.0 mm) | 13.0 | 10.8 | 12.3 | 10.6 | 11.3 | 9.8 | 10.3 | 8.9 | 10.8 | 12.0 | 13.3 | 13.1 | 136.2 |
Source: Météo-France

=== Urban geography ===
During the Middle Age, the city grew in a northward-facing semicircle around its primitive core, beyond the area spread out between the church Saint Martin and the former fortified castle. The existence of this south boundary remained until the 18th century and marked an urban expansion which mainly occurred on the western and northern sides of the town. Increasing industrialisation, land transport improvement, continued population growth and the resulting need for suitable low cost lands for housing and manufacturing plants, all of which finally led to expand the city southward from the centre, in the 19th century.

== Toponymy ==
The current city's name is most likely derived from Frankish rausa "reed" and baki "brook". Therefore, the meaning of Roubaix can, in all likelihood, find its origin on the banks of its three historical brooks: Espierre, Trichon and Favreuil. The place was mentioned for the first time in a Latinised form in the 9th century: Villa Rusbaci. Thereafter, the following names were in use: 1047 and 1106 Rubais, 1122 Rosbays, 1166 Rusbais, 1156 and 1202 Robais, 1223 Roubais. Over the span of centuries, the name evolved to Roubaix as shown on Mercator's map of Flanders published at Leuven in 1540.

Parallel to the official and usual name Roubaix, some translations are worth a mention. Firstly, though the city has never belonged to the Flemish-speaking area, the seldom-heard renderings Robeke and Roodebeeke are documented for Roubaix. Furthermore, the Dutch Language Union established Robaais as the city's proper Dutch name. Lastly, one can cite Rosbacum as the definite Latin transcription of Roubaix which has been in use since the 19th century, as recorded on dedication statements sealed in the first stones of the foundations of the Hôtel de Ville (City Hall) laid in 1840 and the Church of Notre Dame laid in 1842.

== History ==
During the repression of January and February 1894, the police conducted raids targeting the anarchists living there, without much success.

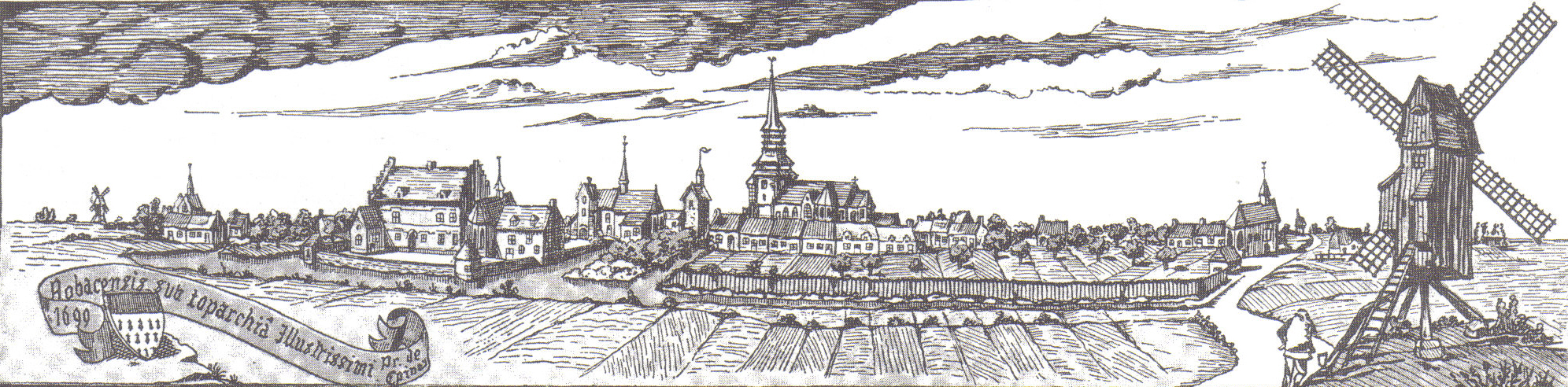
View of the city, dated 1699. Landscape with the castle, surrounded by a moat, next to the Sainte-Elisabeth hospital at left, the mill at right and the Saint-Martin church, regarded as the city's centre point, at centre

== Heraldry ==
| Arms of Roubaix | The arms of Roubaix are blazoned: Party per pale ermine a chief gules and azure, thereon between two bobbins argent a five-pointed star or in chief, a wool-cards at its centre and a shuttle fesswise in base or, all within a bordure indented of the same. |

== People ==
Inhabitants of Roubaix are known in English as "Roubaisians" and in French as Roubaisiens (pronounced [ʁu.bɛ.zjɛ̃]) or in the feminine form Roubaisiennes (pronounced [ʁu.bɛ.zjɛn]), also natively called Roubaignots (pronounced [ʁu.bɛ.njo]) or in the feminine form Roubaignotes (pronounced [ʁu.bɛ.njoz]).

=== Demographics ===
Historical population

| Year | Pop. | ±% p.a. |
|---|---|---|
| 1716 | 4,715 | — |
| 1764 | 7,363 | +0.93% |
| 1789 | 8,559 | +0.60% |
| 1793 | 9,120 | +1.60% |
| 1800 | 8,091 | −1.70% |
| 1801 | 8,151 | +0.74% |
| 1805 | 8,703 | +1.65% |
| 1806 | 8,724 | +0.24% |
| 1817 | 8,724 | +0.00% |
| 1821 | 12,170 | +8.68% |
| 1830 | 13,132 | +0.85% |
| 1831 | 18,187 | +38.49% |
| 1836 | 19,455 | +1.36% |
| 1841 | 24,802 | +4.98% |
| 1842 | 24,892 | +0.36% |
| 1846 | 31,039 | +5.67% |
| 1851 | 34,698 | +2.25% |
| 1856 | 39,445 | +2.60% |
| 1861 | 49,274 | +4.55% |
| 1866 | 65,091 | +5.73% |
| 1872 | 75,987 | +2.61% |
| 1876 | 83,661 | +2.43% |
| 1881 | 91,757 | +1.86% |

| Year | Pop. | ±% p.a. |
|---|---|---|
| 1886 | 100,299 | +1.80% |
| 1891 | 114,917 | +2.76% |
| 1896 | 124,661 | +1.64% |
| 1901 | 124,365 | −0.05% |
| 1906 | 121,017 | −0.54% |
| 1911 | 122,723 | +0.28% |
| 1921 | 113,265 | −0.80% |
| 1926 | 117,209 | +0.69% |
| 1931 | 117,190 | −0.00% |
| 1936 | 107,105 | −1.78% |
| 1946 | 100,978 | −0.59% |
| 1954 | 110,067 | +1.08% |
| 1962 | 112,856 | +0.31% |
| 1968 | 114,547 | +0.25% |
| 1975 | 109,553 | −0.63% |
| 1982 | 101,602 | −1.07% |
| 1990 | 97,746 | −0.48% |
| 1999 | 96,984 | −0.09% |
| 2007 | 97,423 | +0.06% |
| 2012 | 94,536 | −0.60% |
| 2017 | 96,990 | +0.51% |
| 2023 | 98,286 | +0.22% |

From 1962 to 1999: population without double counting
Source: L.E. Marissal for 1716, 1789, 1801, 1805, 1817, 1830 and 1842, Comte du Muy for 1764, Ldh/EHESS/Cassini until 2006 and INSEE from 2007

The evolution of the number of inhabitants is known through the population censuses carried out in the town since 1793 and the research study of Louis-Edmond Marissal, Clerk of the Peace of the city, published in 1844. Roubaix evolved into a provincial market town until the end of the Early modern period with a census population of 4,715 inhabitants in 1716. By the late 18th century, the city began to emerge as regional textile manufacturing centre and its population increased, reaching a level of 8,091 in 1800. As a result of the industrialisation process of the 19th century, the need of workers was supplied by rural flight as well as immigration. Belgian settlement was a feature of the Roubaisian life at that time.

During the first-half period of the 19th century, Roubaix ranked the first French town in terms of population growth rate with a five times increase, whereas in the remaining period of this century its population doubled. Within this last time framework, Belgian immigration appeared to be one of the major factor to explain the significantly high population growth, with 30,465 Belgian inhabitants counted in 1866 and 42,103 in 1872. Nonetheless, the rate of natural increase grew to be a more important component of the population growth in that period.

At the 20th century threshold, the Roubaisian population reached a peak of 124,661, from which it progressively declined over the successive decades. Occupied by German troops from October 1914 to October 1918, Roubaix belonged to the combat zone of the Western Front during the First World War. Over this occupation period, Roubaisians suffered from dearth, deportation for compulsory labour and unusual casualties with a rather slight population drop from 122,723 to 113,265 between the 1911 and 1921 censuses.

The population of the city was 98,286 as of January 2023. This makes Roubaix the fourth largest municipality in the region Hauts-de-France, after Lille, Amiens and Tourcoing.

As of 2019, at least 25% of residents in Roubaix were immigrants, mainly of Arab, North African, Turkish, and Sub-Saharan African origin.

=== Languages ===
Although the region of Roubaix was subjected many times to the domination of Flanders' rulers throughout its history, Roubaisians have used a local Picard variant as the language of everyday life for centuries. This spoken vernacular is locally known as Roubaignot. Until the early 20th century this patois prevailed. Therefore, French language progressive penetration into local culture should not only be analysed as a result of the industrialisation and urbanisation of the area but should also be considered in terms of public education policies.

=== Religion ===
==== Christianity ====
The city of Roubaix is divided into six Catholic parishes and belongs to the deanery of the same name in the archdiocese of Lille.

==== Judaism ====
In the aftermath of the Franco-Prussian War and the German annexation of Alsace-Lorraine, many Jews left their homes and emigrated. Jewish arrival in Roubaix derives from that bitter period of history. At the time, the new immigrant community, even though its small size, dedicated a building to Jewish faith and liturgical practises. The newly opened synagogue, located in a house at number 51 on the narrow rue des Champs, operated more than 60 years, until 1939, when it was closed under imprecise local circumstances as the Nazi regime took over in Europe. Despite the closure of the synagogue, the occupation and police raids, (Note: The Jewish population of Roubaix dropped from 160 members in the beginning of its settlement to 68 in 1942.) the local practise of Judaism saw a humble revival after the war which lasted until the start of the 1990s when the modest Jewry of Roubaix handed over its Sefer Torah to the care of the Jewish community of Lille. Roubaix has no longer been home to a Jewish place of worship since that event. The house inside which the first one was created 123 years ago, has been demolished since an urban renewal project occurred in 2000. On 10 September 2015 the mayor unveiled a commemorative plaque on the rue des Champs, as a tribute to the Roubaisian Jewry, in memory of the religious purpose of this previous building.

==== Islam ====
As of August 2013, there were six mosques in the town, including one under construction. According to estimates by the mayor's office, around 20,000 people, or at least 20% of the population were Muslims. Over one-in-three residents in Roubaix are of Arab, North African, Turkish, and Sub-Saharan African origin. Four areas of the cemetery were designated for Muslims.

==== Buddhism ====
During the second half of the 20th century, the city took in Buddhist communities from originally Buddhist countries in the Southeast Asian peninsula including Cambodia, Laos, Thailand, and Vietnam. Within this background Roubaix has brought together two Buddhist traditions on its territory, hence cultural variations across communities: Mahāyāna and Theravāda with, respectively, one and four places of worship.

== Administrative and political affairs ==
=== Constituencies and cantons ===
Roubaix grouped four cantons from 1988 to 2012. Since then, this number has fallen to two with Roubaix 1 and Roubaix 2. After the last redistricting of French legislative constituencies in 2010, the city is now divided into two constituencies: Nord's 7th constituency which include the former canton of Roubaix-Ouest and Nord's 8th constituency formed by the following former cantons: Roubaix-Centre, Roubaix-Nord and Roubaix-Est.

=== Administrative zoning ===
==== Eastern district neighbourhoods ====
- Fraternité
- Pile
- Sainte-Elisabeth
- Sartel-Carihem
- Trois Ponts

==== Western district neighbourhoods ====
- Epeule
- Fresnoy-Mackellerie
- Trichon

==== Central district neighbourhoods ====
- Anseele Motte-Bossut
- Barbieux
- Centre-ville
- Crouy
- Espérance
- Nations-Unies
- Vauban

==== Northern district neighbourhoods ====
- Alma-Gare
- Armentières
- Cul de Four
- Entrepont
- Fosses aux Chênes
- Hommelet
- Hutin-Oran-Cartigny

==== Southern district neighbourhoods ====
- Chemin Neuf
- Edouard Vaillant
- Hauts-Champs
- Justice
- Linné-Boulevards
- Moulin
- Nouveau Roubaix
- Petites-Haies
- Potennerie

=== Mayors of the city ===
| Mayor | Term start | Term end | Party (Note: Under French State's dictatorship from 1940 to 1944, mayors of communes over 2,000 inhabitants were not elected democratically. The mayor was nominated by the government of Marshal Philippe Pétain in communes of over 10,000 inhabitants and the prefet in communes less than 10,000 inhabitants and more than 2,000. The mayor in communes less than 2,000 inhabitants was elected by the city council. Mayors of communes of the Zone interdite were nominated by prefects in agreement with the German authorities. Therefore, mayors are not affiliated to a political party for this period of time.) |
|---|---|---|---|
| Henri Carette | May 1892 | December 1901 | POF |
| Edouard Roussel | December 1901 | January 1902 | UDR |
| Eugène Motte | January 1902 | May 1912 | FR |
| Jean-Baptiste Lebas (Note: Jean-Baptiste Lebas's mandate was interrupted when he was arrested on 7 March 1915 by German authorities to be imprisoned in the fortress of Rastatt.) | May 1912 | March 1915 | SFIO |
| Henri Thérin (Note: Henri Thérin, the first deputy mayor, stood in for Jean-Baptiste Lebas during his imprisonment time.) | March 1915 | October 1918 | SFIO |
| Jean-Baptiste Lebas | October 1918 | June 1940 | SFIO |
| Fleuris Vanherpe (Note: Fleuris Vanherpe, the eldest deputy mayor of the city council, supplanted Jean-Baptiste Lebas after his forfeiture in June 1940, and was entrusted functions of mayor on 18 December 1940. His death, on August 17, 1941, put an early end to his mandate.) | June 1940 | August 1941 | |
| Marcel Guislain | August 1941 | December 1941 | |
| Alphonse Verbeurgt | January 1942 | May 1942 | |
| Charles Bauduin | May 1942 | July 1942 | |
| Victor Provo (Note: Victor Provo accepted the mandate in 1942. He was maintained by resistance committees in 1944 then elected in April 1945.) | July 1942 | March 1977 | SFIO then PS |
| Pierre Prouvost | March 1977 | March 1983 | PS |
| André Diligent | March 1983 | May 1994 | UDF-CDS |
| René Vandierendonck | May 1994 | March 2012 | UDF-CDS then DVG and finally PS |
| Pierre Dubois | March 2012 | March 2014 | PS |
| Guillaume Delbar | April 2014 | March 2026 | UMP then LR and finally DVD |
| David Guiraud | March 2026 | – | LFI |

== Twin towns and sister cities ==
Roubaix is twinned with:

- Bradford, United Kingdom, since 1969
- Mönchengladbach, Germany, since 1969
- Verviers, Belgium, since 1969
- Skopje, North Macedonia, since 1973
- Prato, Italy, since 1981
- Sosnowiec, Poland, since 1993
- Covilhã, Portugal, since 2000
- Bouïra, Algeria, since 2003

== Landmarks ==
Thus, the city got an architectural work in the French history and culture of the 19th century Industrial Revolution and was designated Town of Art and History on 13 December 2000. Ever since the Ministry of Culture gave Roubaix the label, the city has entered the 21st century by promoting its cultural standing as the inheritance of its industrial and social history.

Several profane or sacral buildings of Roubaix are registered as historic monuments.

Secular buildings registered as monuments historiques

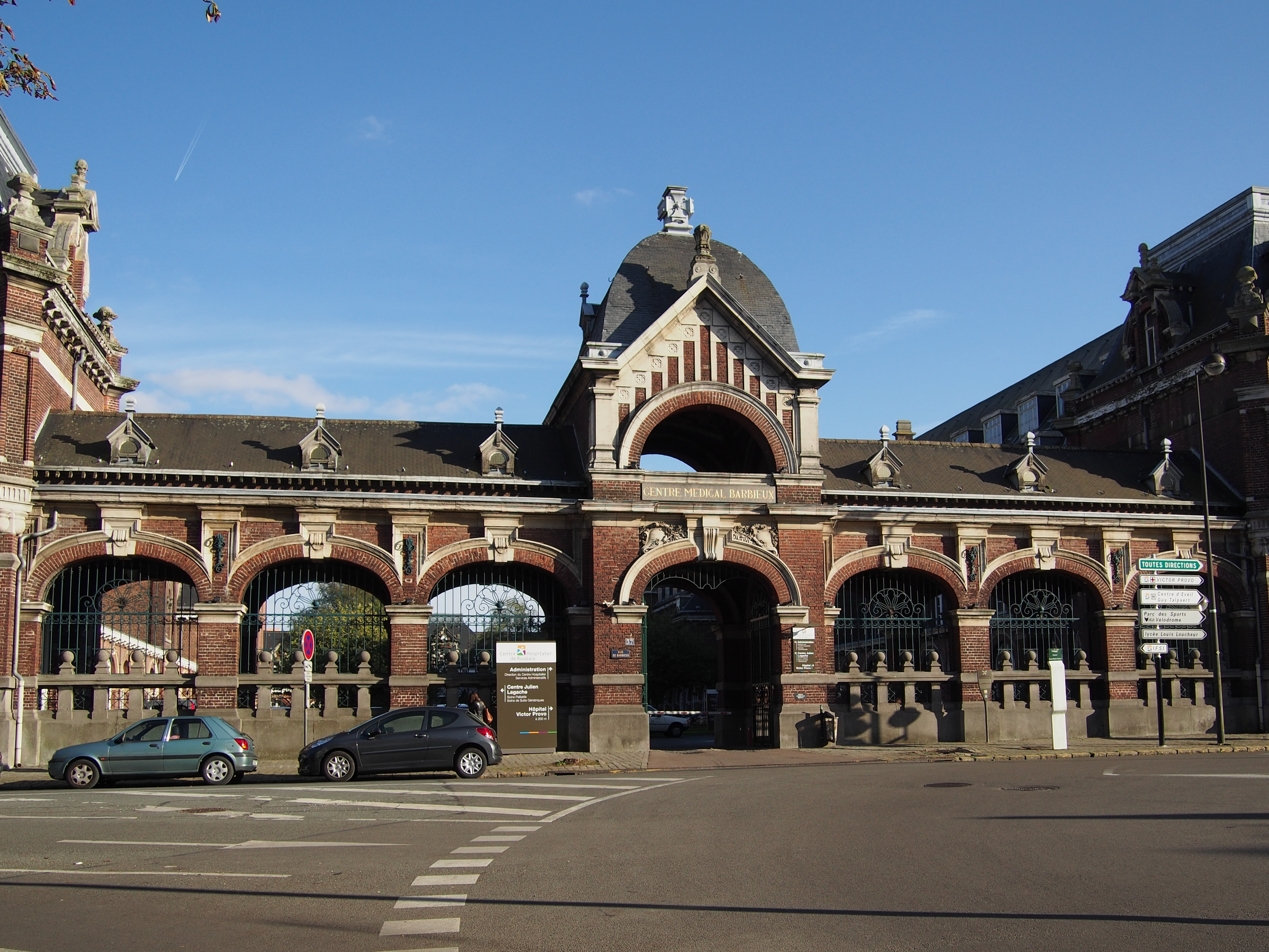
Barbieux health centre

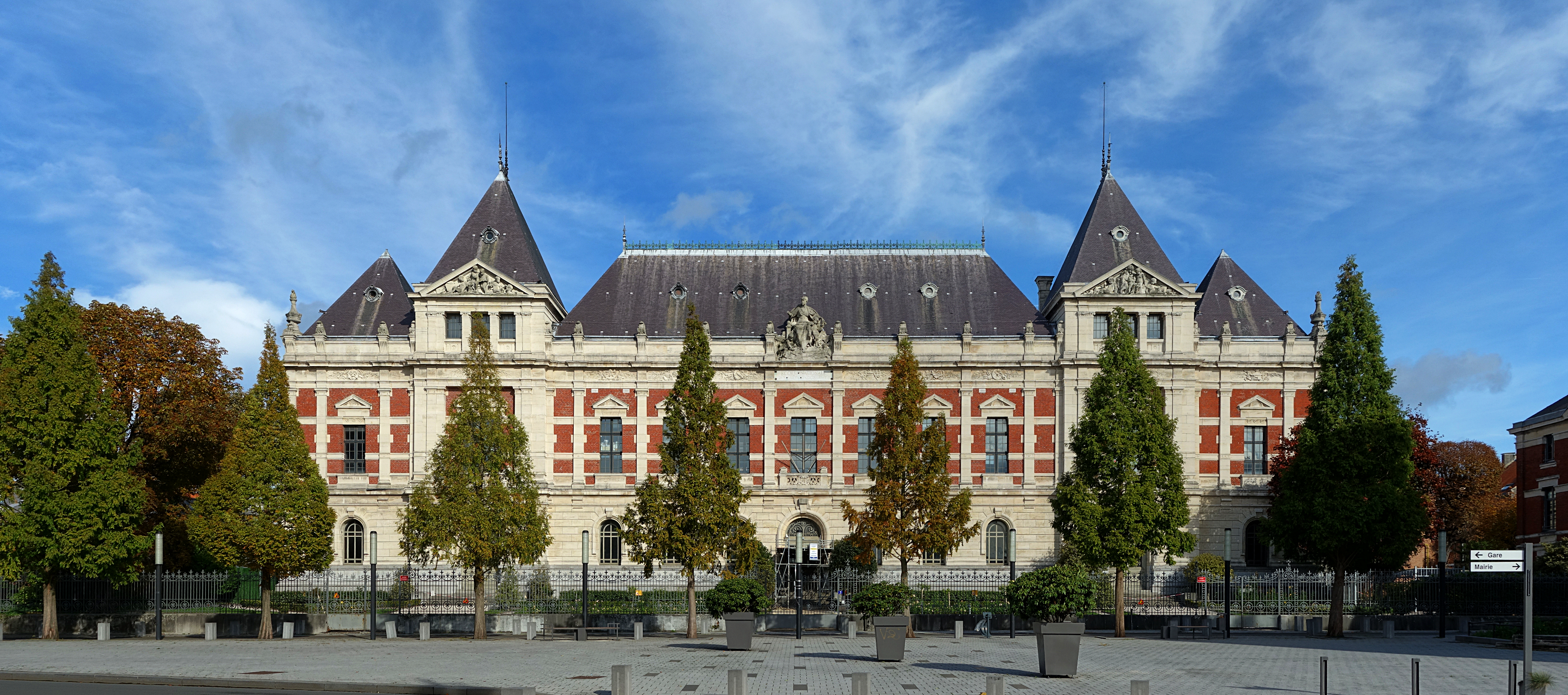
ENSAIT

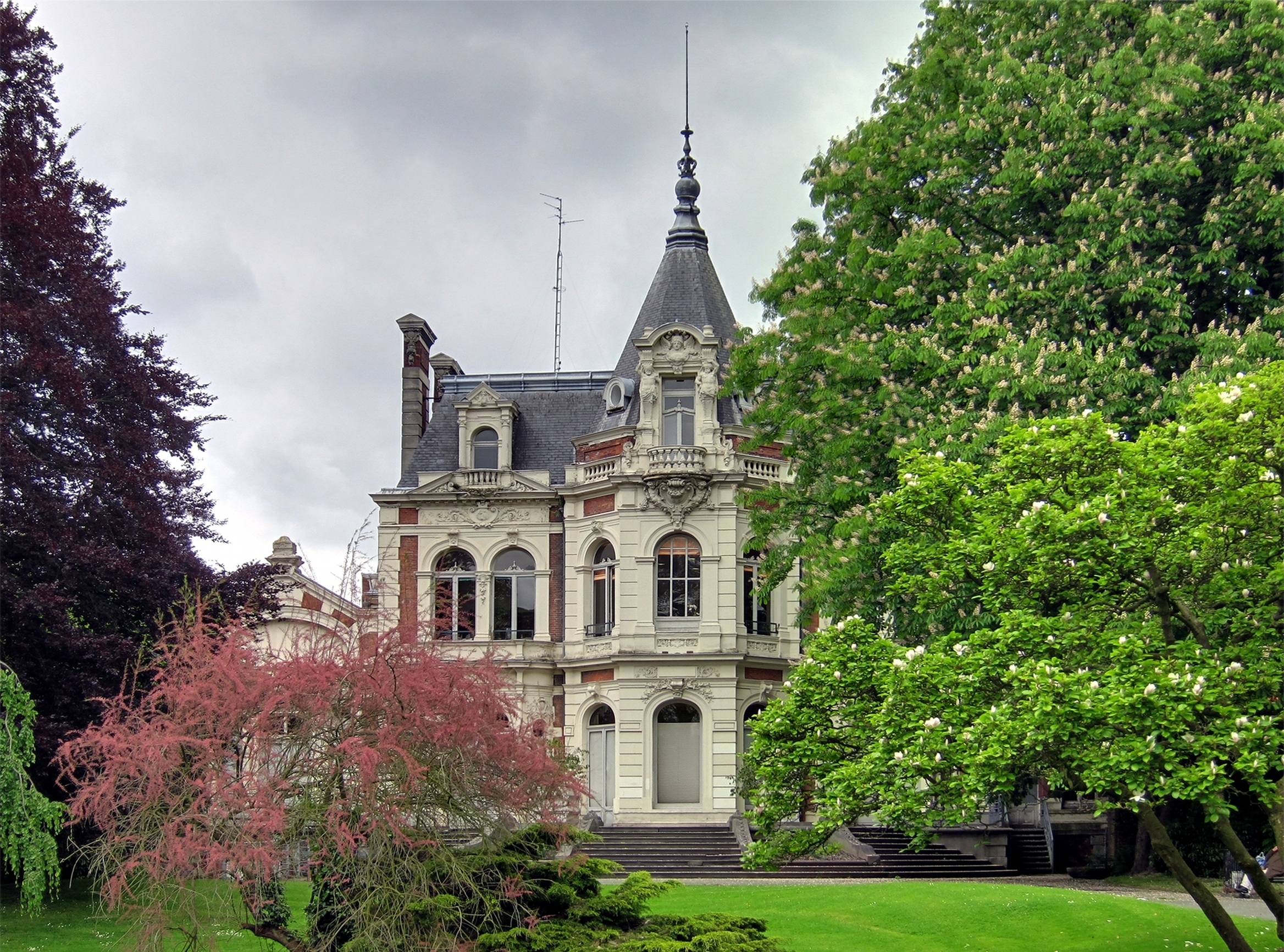
Prouvost private mansion

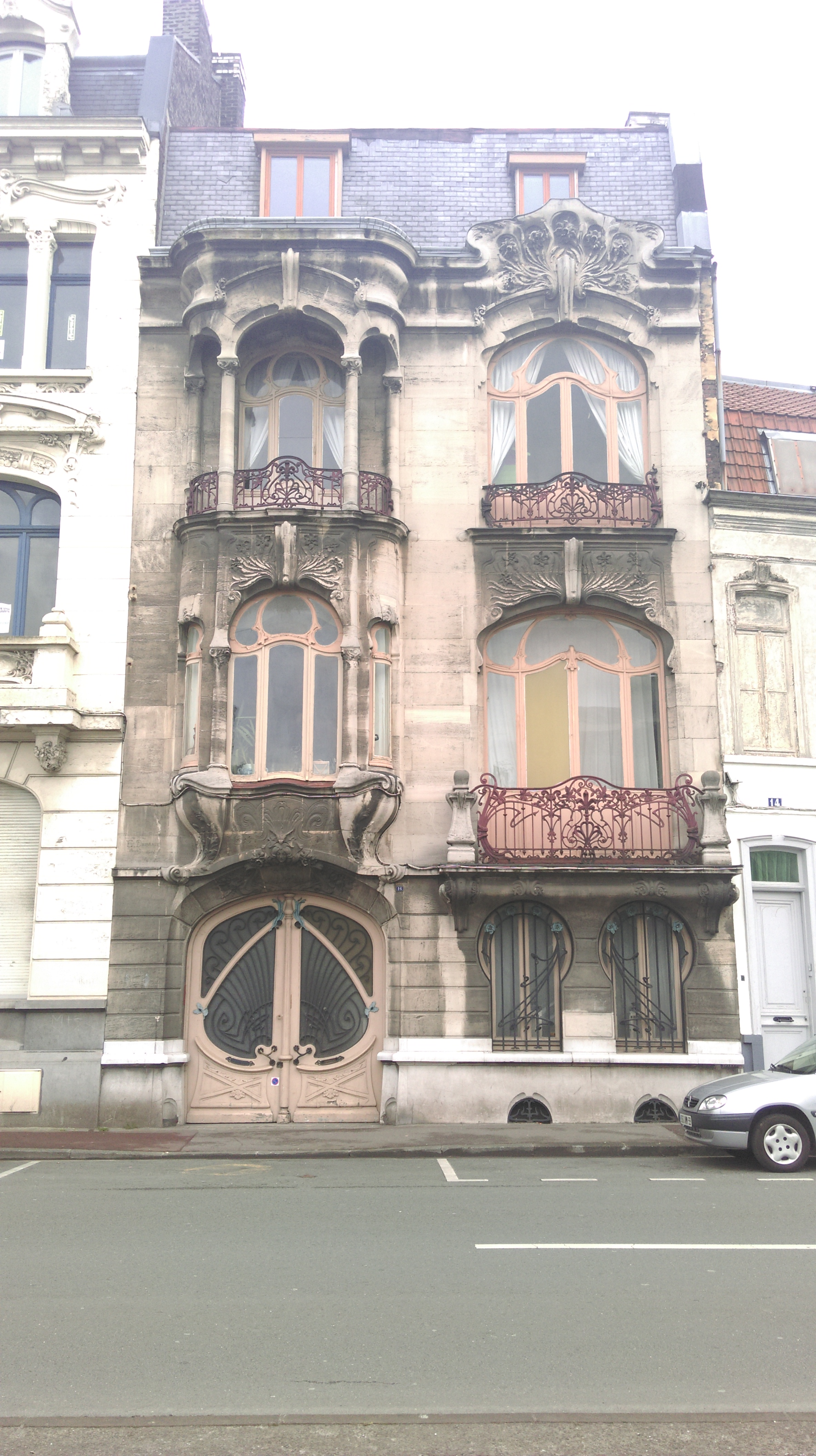
Art nouveau house

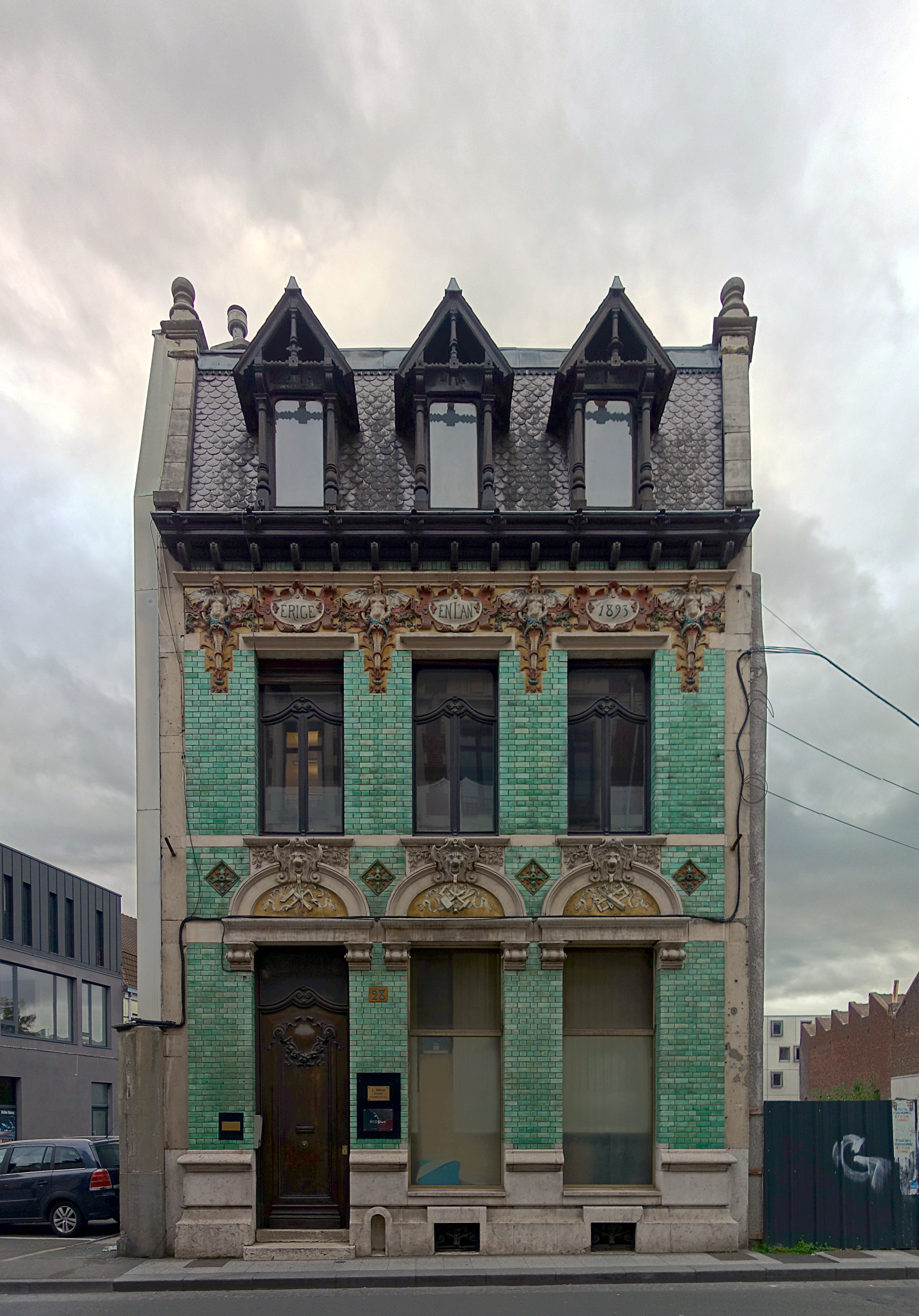
Three-storey stately house

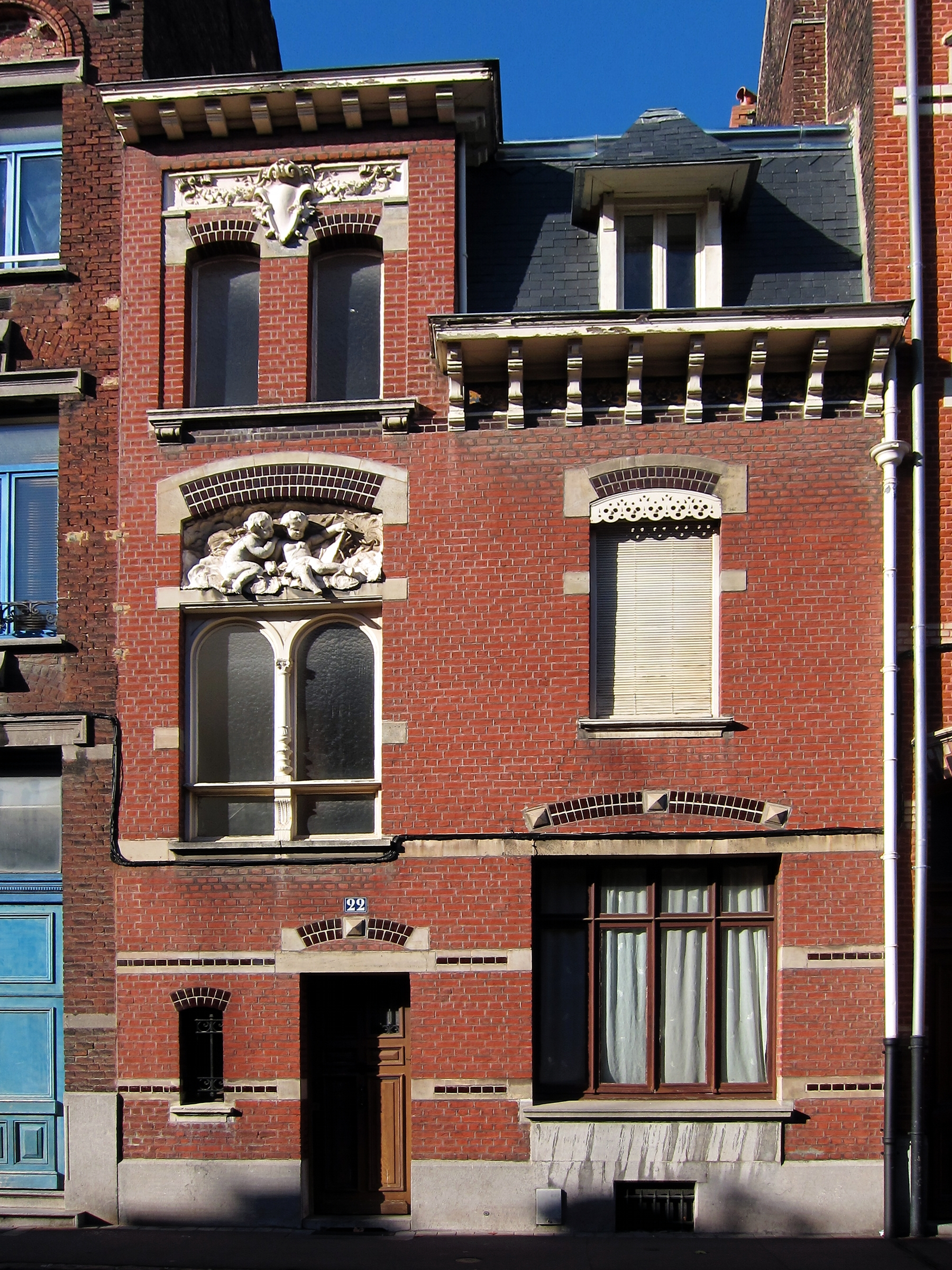
Rémy Cogghe's house

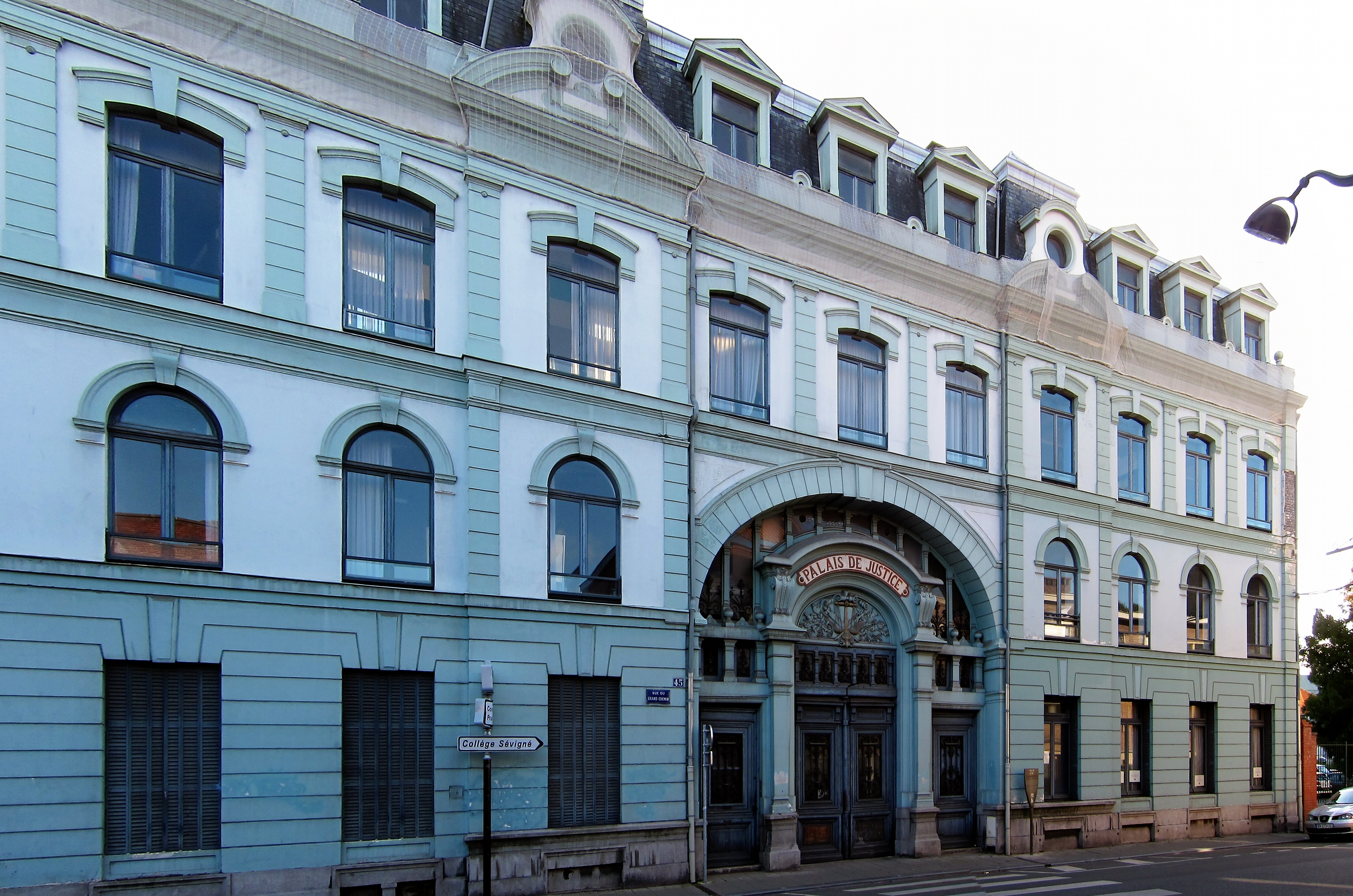
Law court

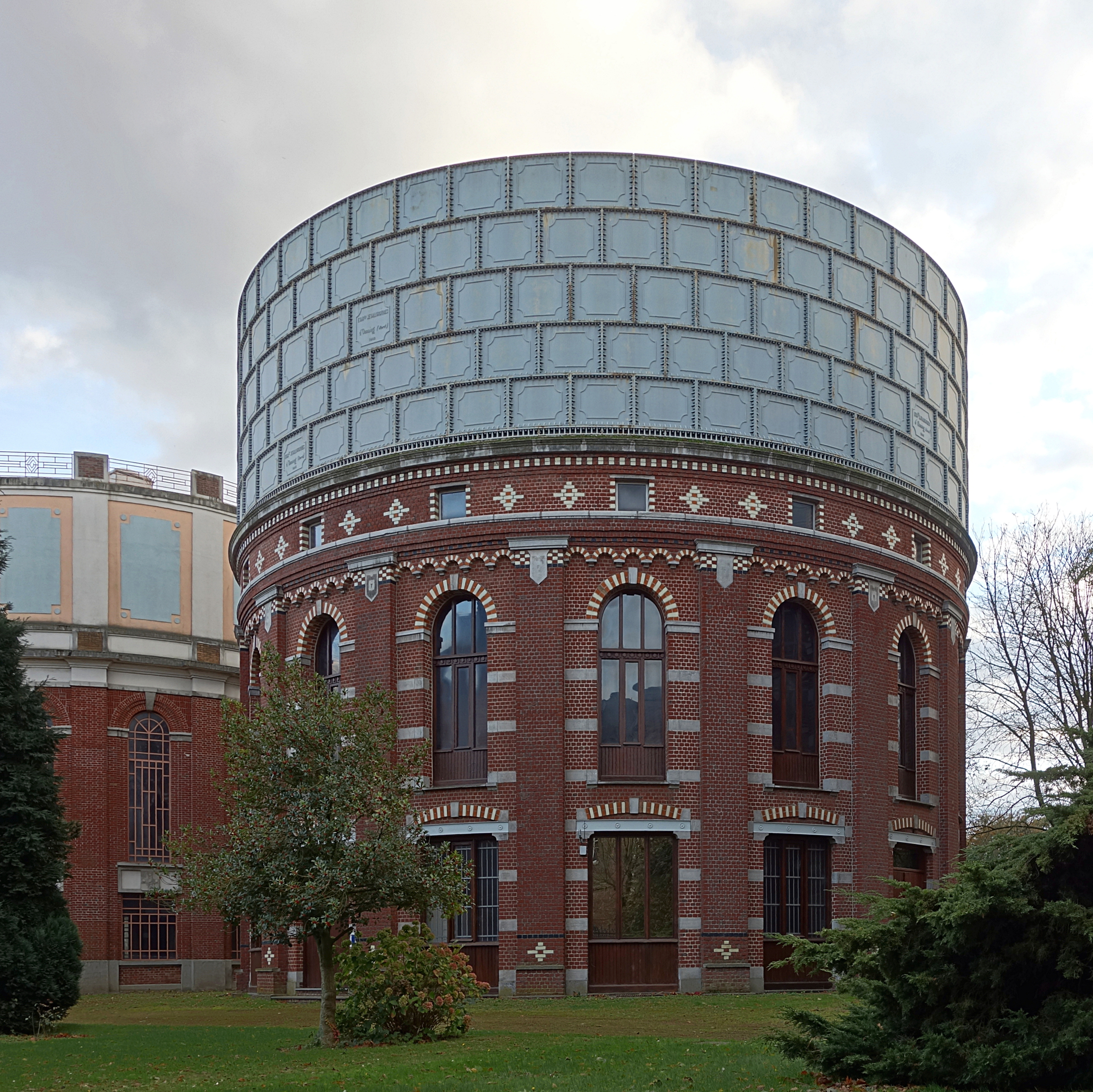
Huchon water tower

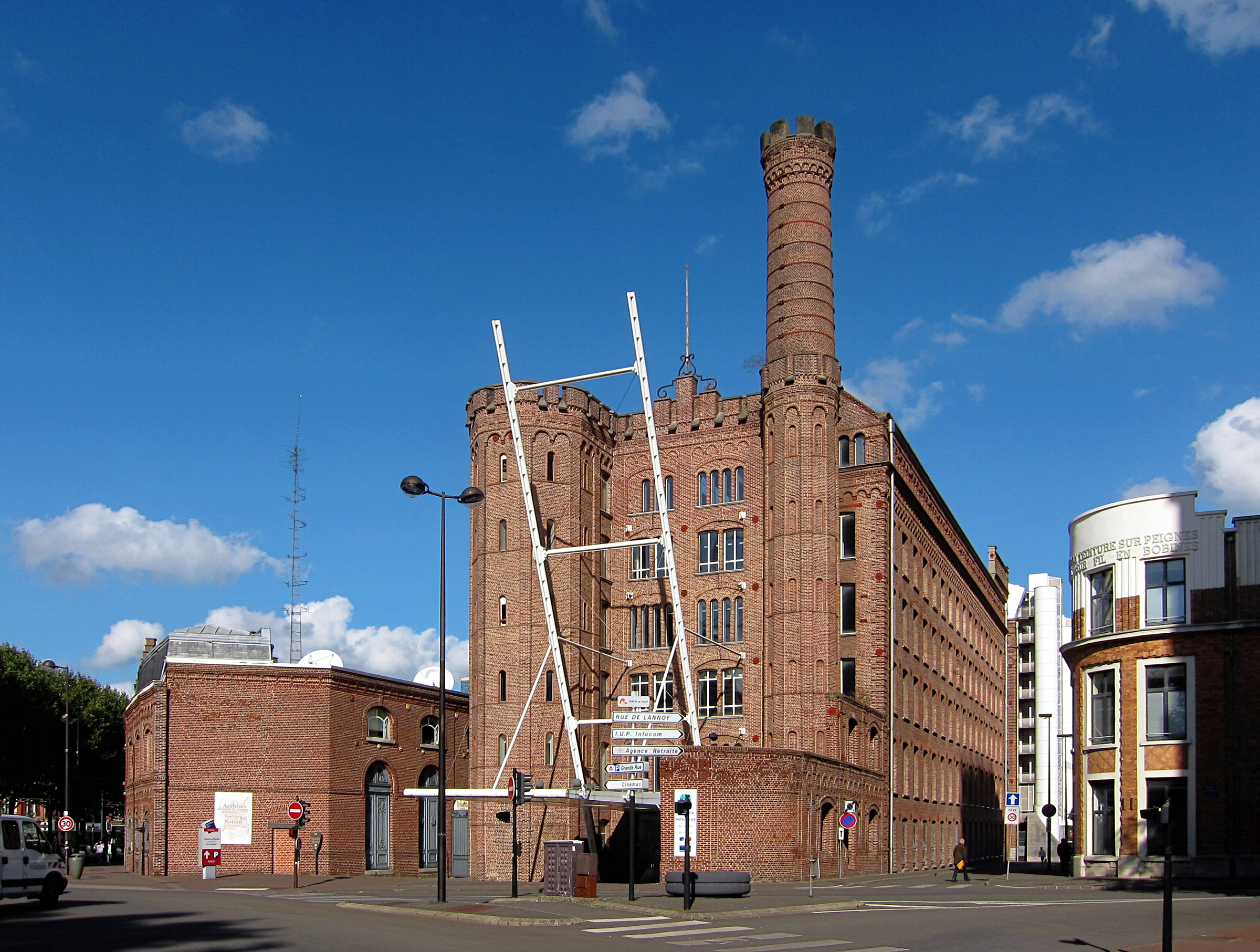
National Archives of the Working World

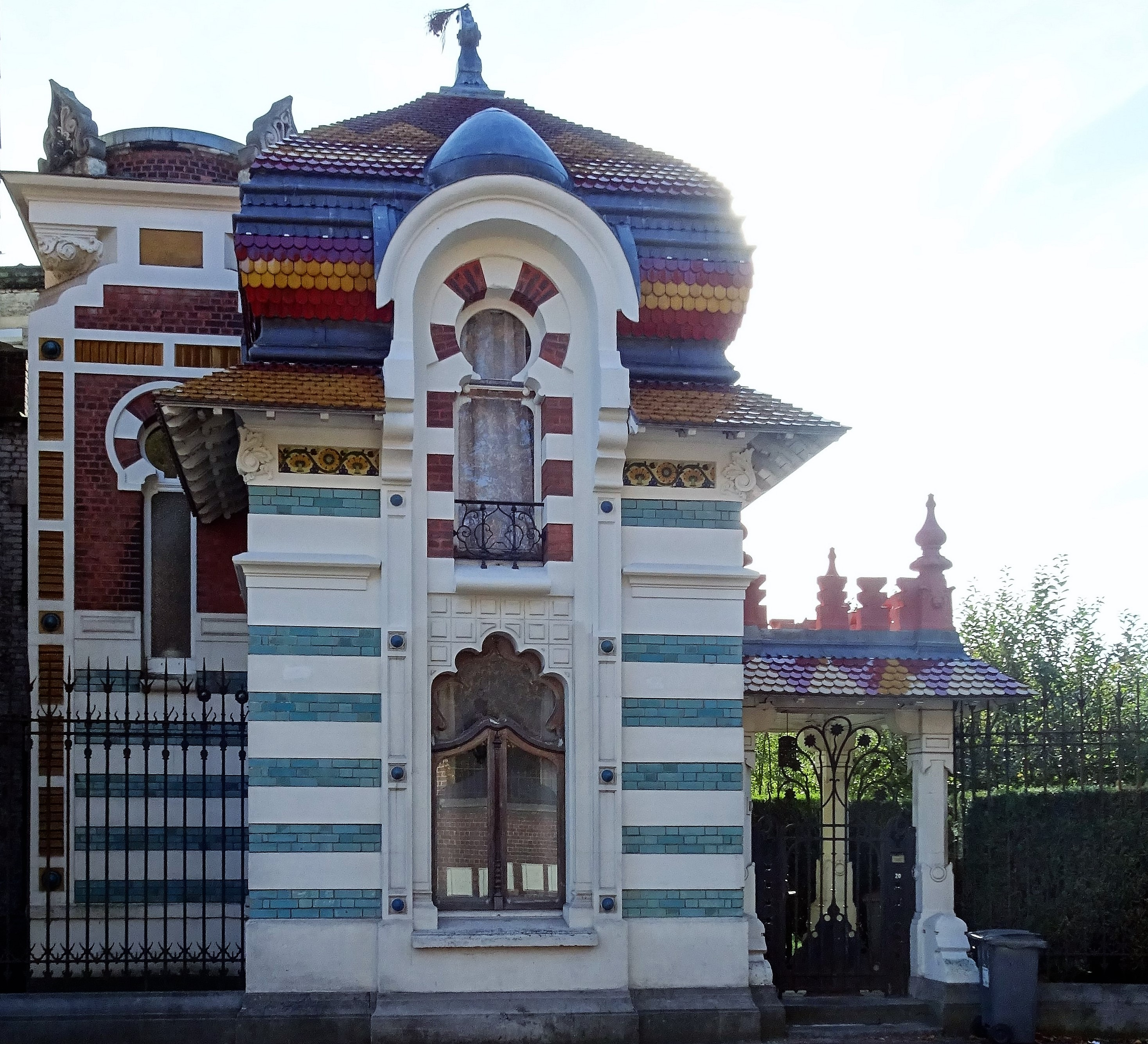
Concierge of the demolished Palais Vaissier

Religious structures registered as monuments historiques

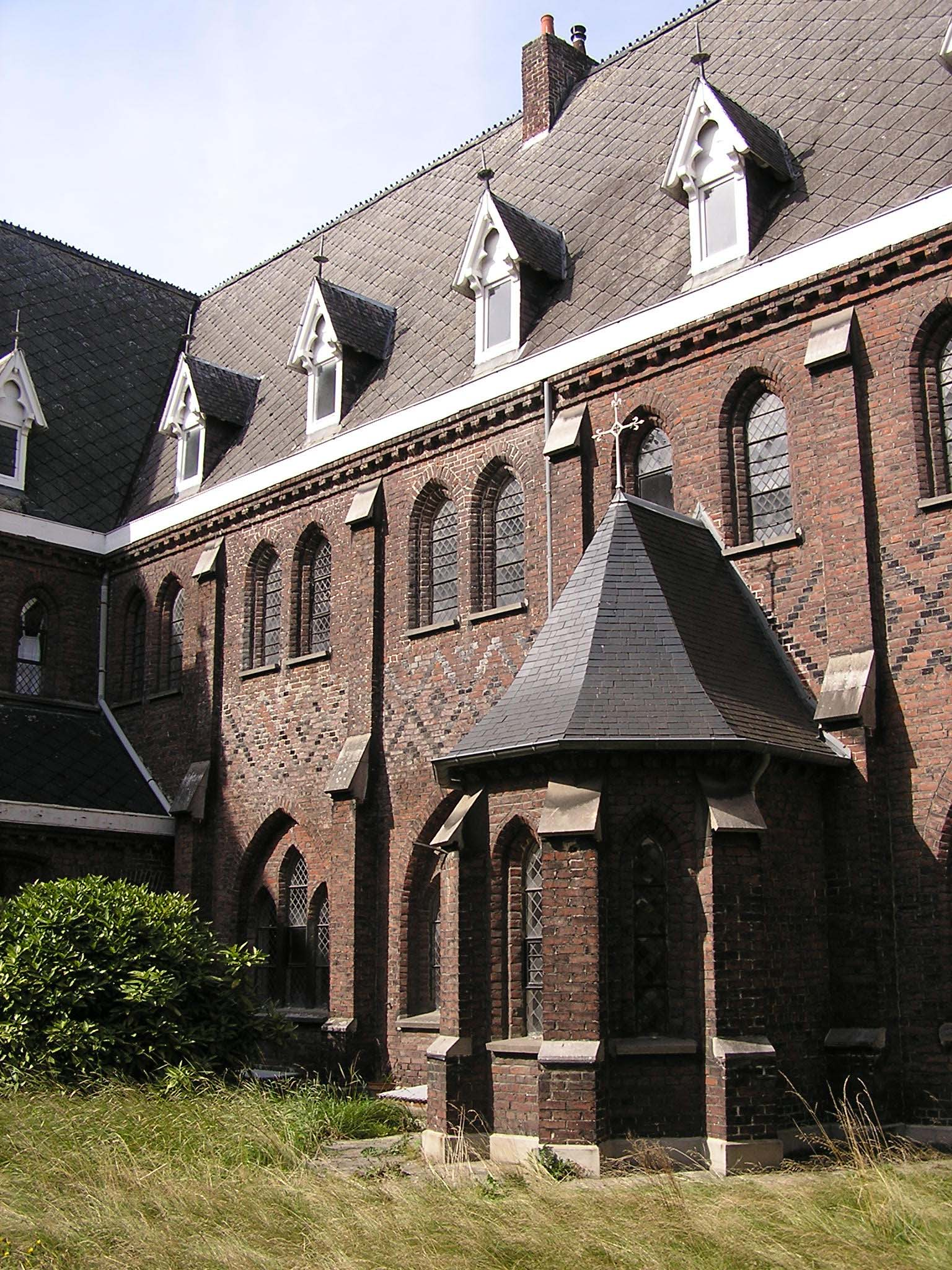
Convent of Clarisses

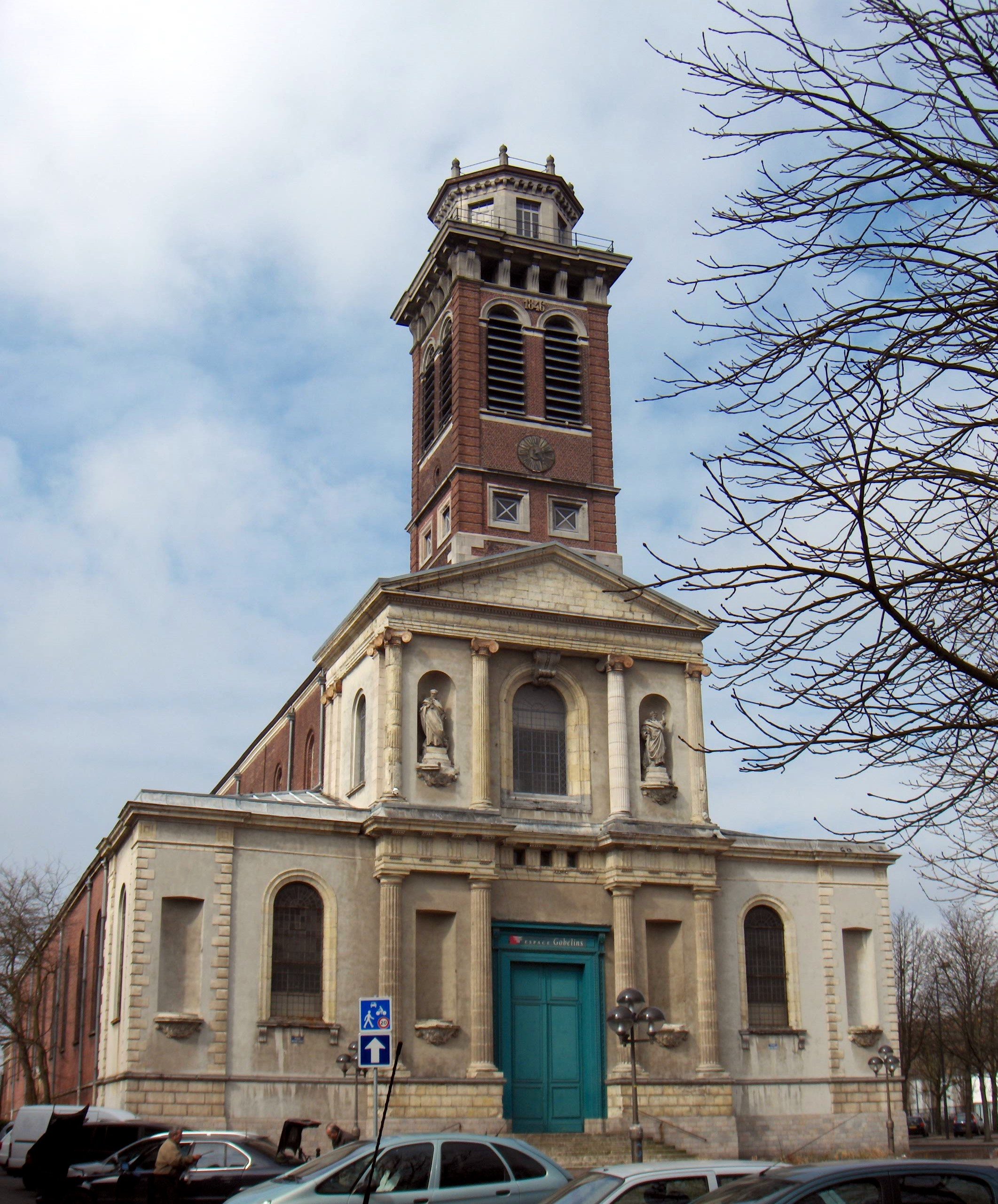
Deconsecrated Church Notre-Dame

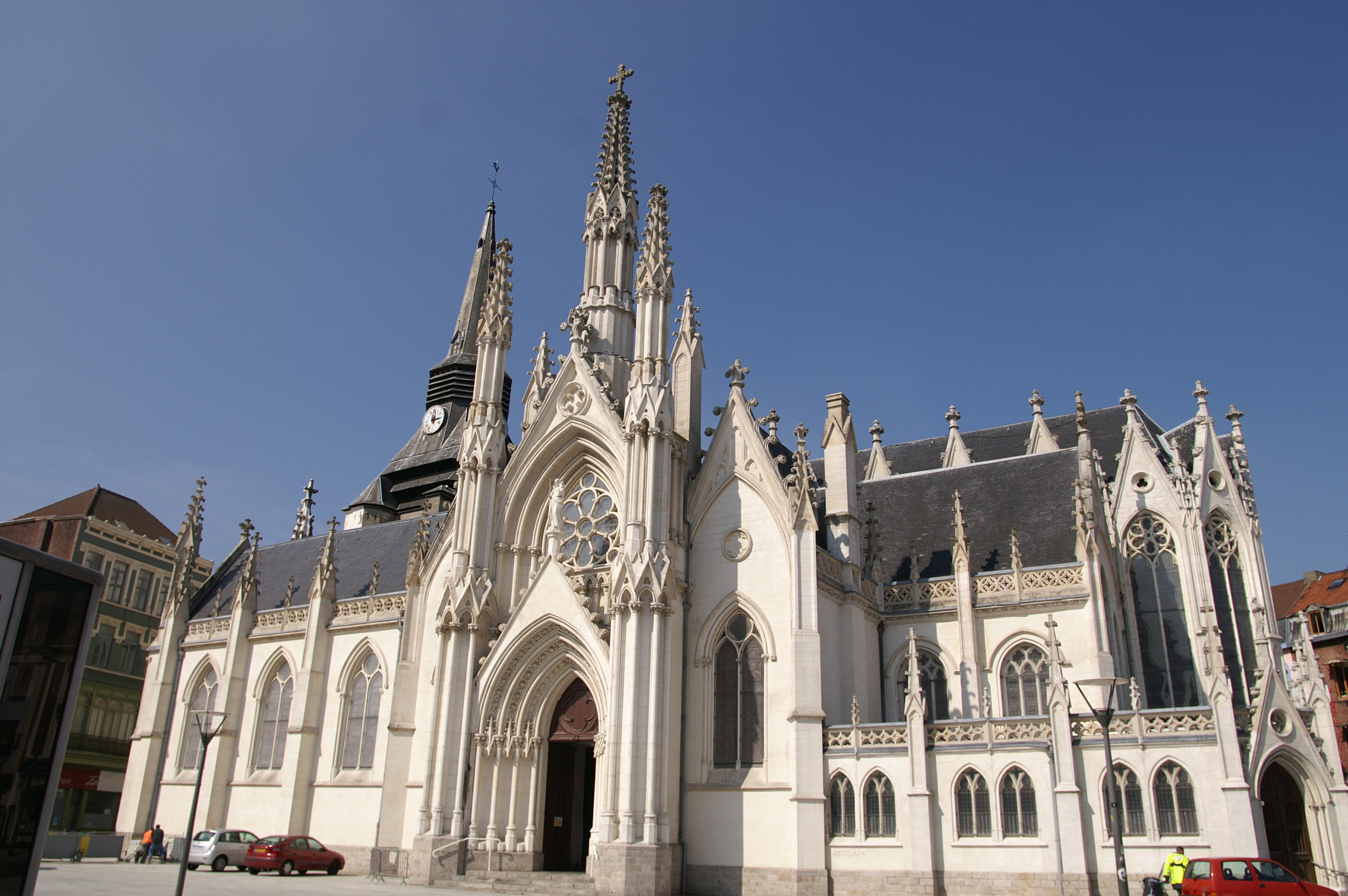
Church Saint-Martin

=== Sculptures and memorials ===
The city has been the place where illustrious names of French sculptors put their skills to create memorial monuments since the end of the 19th century until the middle of the 20th century. After a long slack period 2010 introduced a shift in the genre with the unveiling of Wim Delvoye's Discobolos, a statue of modern art conceived as a welcoming sign to a neighbourhood of the city. The sculptures and memorial monuments in Roubaix which deserve notice for their historical or artistical interest are mentioned below.

- Discobolos: a New patrons project by Wim Delvoye (sculptor), Bruno Dupont (mediator), Fondation de France and city of Roubaix (supporters), ordered by the neighbourhood residents with the members of the Hommelet neighbourhood committee (Note: A local association (as per the 1901 law about association) called "Comité de quartier de l'Hommelet") and inaugurated on 5 June 2010
- Joan of Arc statue: Maxime Real del Sarte (sculptor), inaugurated on 27 May 1952
- Memorial to Jean-Baptiste Lebas: Albert de Jaeger (sculptor), funded through public subscription and inaugurated on 23 October 1949
- Memorial to Resistance Martyrs of Roubaix: Albert de Jaeger (sculptor), engraved "Roubaix a ses martyrs de la Résistance" and "Ils ont brisé les chaînes de l'oppression", (Note: "Roubaix has its martyrs of the Resistance" and "They broke the chains of oppression") ordered by the City council and inaugurated on 11 November 1948
- Memorial to Eugène Motte: Raoul Bénard (sculptor), Gustave Poubel (architect), funded through public subscription and inaugurated on 22 September 1935
- Memorial to Jean-Joseph Weerts: Alexandre Descatoire (sculptor), ordered by the City council and inaugurated on 29 October 1931
- Memorial to Louis Bossut: Maxime Real del Sarte (sculptor), ordered by the City council and inaugurated on 4 October 1925
- Monuments aux Morts or World War I Memorial of Roubaix: Alexandre Descatoire (sculptor), Jean-Frédéric Wielhorski (architect), engraved "Roubaix à ses enfants morts pour la défense du pays et pour la paix", (Note: "Roubaix to his children died in defense of the country and for peace") ordered by the City council and inaugurated on 18 October 1925
- Memorial to Jules Guesde: Georgette Agutte-Sembat (sculptor), Albert Bührer (architect), funded through public subscription and inaugurated on 12 April 1925
- Memorial to Amédée Prouvost: Hippolyte Lefèbvre (sculptor), ordered by the City council and inaugurated on 29 October 1922
- Memorial to Pierre Destombes: Corneille Theunissen (sculptor), engraved "Hortorum, Musicae, Librorumque, Studiosus", (Note: "Friend of the gardens, music and books") ordered by the City council and inaugurated on 29 October 1922
- Memorial to Gustave Nadaud: Alphonse-Amédée Cordonnier (sculptor), Gustave Leblanc-Barbedienne (art founder), inaugurated on 11 October 1896

== Culture ==
=== Museums ===
Roubaix has been home to two major museums of the region Hauts-de-France since the beginning of the 21st century: La Piscine (Note: "The Swimming Pool") and La Manufacture; (Note: "The Manufactory") inheriting both of the local socioeconomic history. La Piscine, also known as the Musée d'Art & d'Industrie André Diligent, (Note: "André Diligent Museum of Art and Industry") is one of the most lauded cultural attractions in northern France. This museum is housed in the Art Deco-style former swimming pool of Roubaix, a building remodelled in 2000 to accommodate and exhibit 19th and 20th century collections of the city. (Note: The collections held at the museum include sculptures by Alberto Giacometti, Auguste Rodin, Camille Claudel and Pablo Picasso) After being closed for two years of renovation works and extension, it was reopened to the public in October 2018, becoming more successful than ever before. La Manufacture is the reference textile museum in northern France. It is hosted in an old weaving factory.

=== Painting ===
The most prestigious names of painters, who made their reputation in Roubaix from the middle of the 19th century to the early 20th century are Jean-Joseph Weerts and Rémy Cogghe.

From the end of the Second World War to the beginning of the 1970s, a casual group of young artists from Roubaix and the surrounding region was formed and given the name Groupe de Roubaix. Two painters commonly associated with the group are Arthur Van Hecke and Eugène Leroy.

=== Fashion ===
Anxious to restore the prestige of northern France's textile industry and operating under the label of Maisons de Mode, the cities of Lille and Roubaix have created spaces for new fashion designers to thrive since 2007. The Roubaisian location, next to La Piscine museum, is known as Le Vestiaire. (Note: The Cloakroom) There are fifteen boutiques and fashion studios housed in an old industrial building.

=== Theatre and performing arts centres ===
- Centre chorégraphique national Roubaix - Hauts-de-France (Note: National choreographic centre Roubaix - Hauts-de-France)
- Colisée
- Condition publique
- Théâtre de l'Oiseau-Mouche "Le Garage"
- Théâtre Louis Richard
- Théâtre Pierre de Roubaix

=== Cinema ===
The city of Roubaix has a rich heritage in film production and been the filming location (mostly or partly) of the following productions:

- I Am a Soldier (French: Je suis un soldat), directed by Laurent Larivière in 2015
- My Golden Days (French: Trois souvenirs de ma jeunesse), directed by Arnaud Desplechin in 2015
- Discount, directed by Louis-Julien Petit in 2014
- Queens of the Ring (French: Les Reines du ring), directed by Jean-Marc Rudnicki in 2013
- Blue Is the Warmest Colour (French: La Vie d'Adèle – Chapitres 1 & 2), directed by Abdellatif Kechiche in 2013
- A Christmas Tale (French: Un conte de Noël), directed by Arnaud Desplechin in 2008
- The Banishment (Russian: Изгнание, Izgnanie), directed by Andrey Zvyagintsev in 2007
- In His Hands (French: Entre ses mains), directed by Anne Fontaine in 2005
- The Axe (French: Le couperet), directed by Costa-Gavras in 2005
- Save Me (French: Sauve-Moi), directed by Christian Vincent in 2000
- Flat Land Cities (French: Les Cités de la plaine), directed by Robert Kramer in 1999
- The Dreamlife of Angels (French: La Vie rêvée des anges), directed by Erick Zonca in 1998
- Enigma, directed by Jeannot Szwarc in 1982
- Life Is a Long Quiet River (French: La vie est un long fleuve tranquille), directed by Étienne Chatiliez in 1988
- Hurricane Rosy (Italian: Temporale Rosy, French: Rosy la bourrasque), directed by Mario Monicelli in 1979
- Swimming Instructor (French: Le Maître-nageur), directed by Jean-Louis Trintignant in 1979
- Body of My Enemy (French: Le Corps de mon ennemi), directed by Henri Verneuil in 1976
- A Sunday in Hell (Danish: En Forårsdag i Helvede), Danish documentary directed by Jørgen Leth in 1976
- The Confession (French: L'Aveu), directed by Costa Gavras in 1970

== Higher education ==
- The EDHEC Business School is one of the few Grandes École located outside the Paris Metropolitan Area.
- ENSAIT is a higher education and research institute, gathering all the disciplines related to textiles.
- ESAAT is a design education institute.
- Decentralisation of the Universities of Lille II and Lille III

=== Libraries ===
- Médiathèque "La Grand'Plage"
- National Archives of the World of Work

== Sport ==
Roubaix has an old sporting heritage and is home to the finish of one of the world's oldest races of professional road cycling at its velodrome: Paris–Roubaix, known as the Hell of the North. While Roubaix is famous for its velodrome, there is more to this city than the cycling sports facilities.

The building of indoor and outdoor sports amenities in the city should be associated with its era of economic rise during the industrial revolution, in addition to the development of local sporting clubs and associations. It was the home to historic football club CO Roubaix-Tourcoing which one the Division 1 in 1946-47 and later dissolved in 1970.

In October 2021, Roubaix hosted the 2021 UCI Track Cycling World Championships.

== Economy ==
During the 19th century, Roubaix acquired an international reputation for textile industry and wool production. In the 1970s and 1980s, international competition and automation caused an industrial decline and resulted in the closure of many factories. From that moment on and since the implementation of the French urban policy in the early 1980s, around three-fourths of the town's territory has been regularly assigned specific zoning designations as well as health and welfare plans.

Roubaix's high level of unemployment is a consequence of the deindustrialisation. The town is listed among France's poorest cities. Successive local governments have tried to address difficulties associated with deindustrialisation by attracting new industries, making the most of the town's cultural credentials and organising a strong student presence on different campuses. While undergoing conversion efforts, the city is experimenting with new models and able to take advantage of successful economic stories, with online retail and information technology, and seems to be on the way to reverse the decades of decline.

=== Textile industry ===
Nowadays, local textile companies are focusing on developing high-tech textile products.

=== Commerce and services ===
Mail order companies of international renown such as La Redoute, Damart and 3 Suisses, stemmed from textile industries which were founded in Roubaix. Showroomprive.com has been locally established since 2016 as an e-commerce company that specialises in online flash sales.

=== Information technology and e-business ===
- OVH was created in Roubaix in 1999 and became a global IT infrastructure company, creating more than thousand jobs in the city and surroundings. Its head office is still in Roubaix.
- Ankama Games has established its head office in Roubaix since 2007.
- Blanchemaille, an e-commerce cluster helped by the incubator EuraTechnologies, has been established in the former building of La Redoute in Roubaix since 2014.

== Transportation ==
Roubaix's position in the motorway roads network

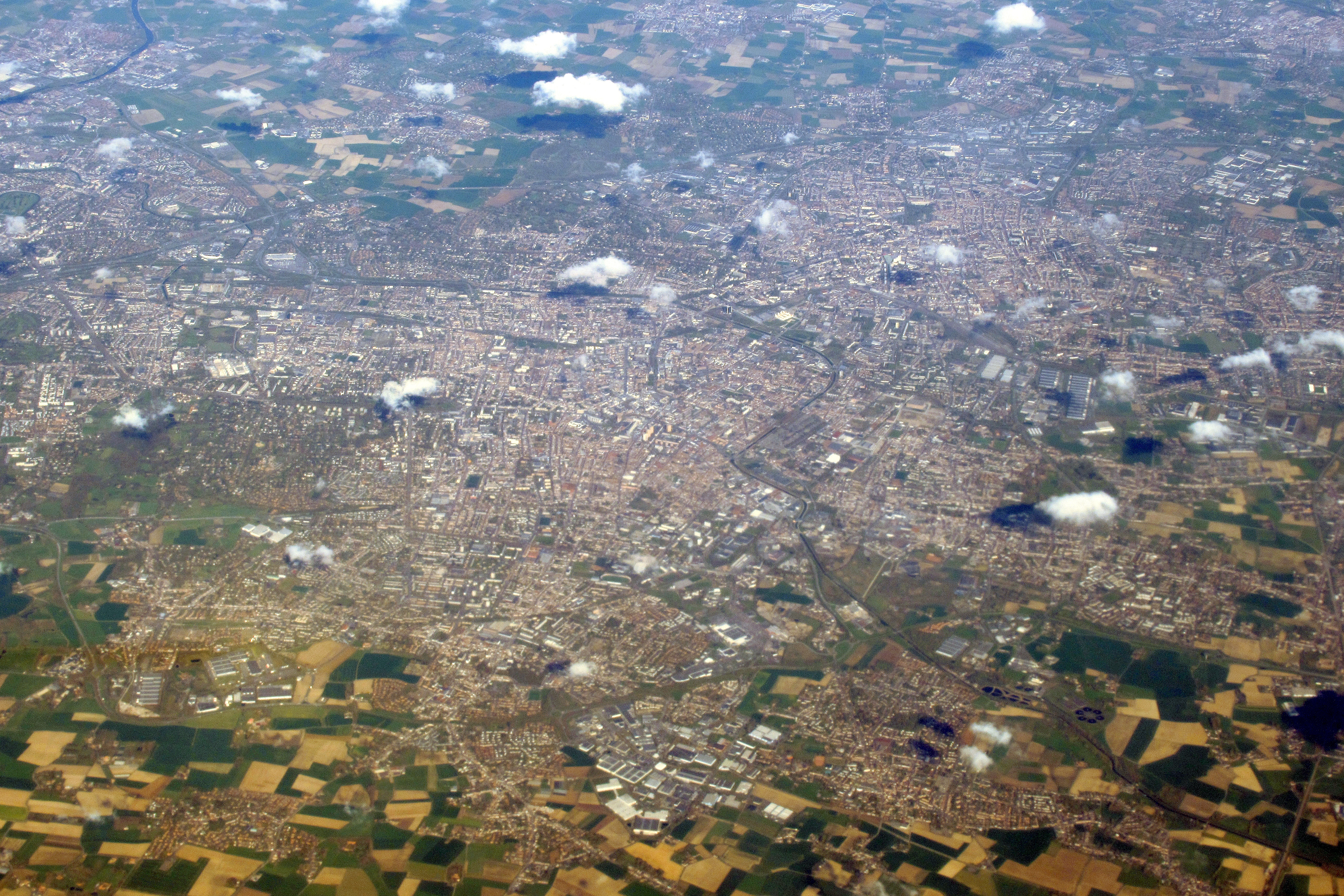
Roubaix and Tourcoing

A22 autoroute, a French part of the European route E17 from Burgundy to Antwerp, is the only motorway, within a motorway roads network of the highest density in France after Paris, which passes by Roubaix.

The Gare de Roubaix railway station offers connections to Antwerp, Lille, Ostend, Paris and Tourcoing.

The city is also served by the Lille Metro.

The city is served by Lille Airport, which is located 20 km (12 mi) south of Roubaix. However, the airport provides direct routes to other parts of France, Europe and Morocco. A large airport in the vicinity is Brussels Airport, located 127 km (79 mi) north east of Roubaix.

== Environmental perspectives ==
Throughout the 1970s and 1980s, deindustrialisation dramatically influenced major urban landscapes across the arrondissement of Lille. Large areas of brownfield land came to mark the city of Roubaix. With the support of the local and national government programs, these areas are acquired and gradually restored or rebuilt.

Roubaix has one of the most efficient biomass district heating plant in France and is therefore among the most advanced cities for sustainability in Hauts-de-France. Since 2014, the city has been engaged in several related initiatives aimed at moving to a circular economy and a zero waste future.

== Notable people ==
=== Artists, musicians and actors ===
- Francis Bousquet (1890–1942): Marseille-born composer
- Étienne Chatiliez (1952–): film director
- Rémy Cogghe (1846–1927): Belgian-born painter who resided in Roubaix
- Jenny Clève (1930–2023): actress
- Georges Delerue (1925–1992): composer who worked on over 350 scores for cinema and television
- Roger Delmotte (1925–): classical trumpeter
- Arnaud Desplechin (1960–): film director
- Édouard Devernay (1889–1952): organist, composer
- Philippe Dhondt (1965–): singer, songwriter and composer known as Boris
- Yvonne Furneaux (1928–): film actress
- Wanani Gradi Mariadi (1990–): rapper known as Gradur
- Jules Gressier (1897–1960): conductor
- Agnès Guillemot (1931–2005): film editor
- Pierre Jansen (1930–2015): film music composer
- Chantal Ladesou (1948–): actress and comedian
- Philippe Lefebvre (1949–): musician, principal organist of Notre Dame Cathedral of Paris
- Léon Mathot (1886–1968): film actor and director
- Gustave Nadaud (1820–1893): songwriter and chansonnier
- Viviane Romance (1912–1991): actress
- Jean-Joseph Weerts (1846–1927): painter

=== Sportspeople ===
- Jean Alavoine (1888–1943): cyclist
- Wassim Aouachria (2000–): football player
- Arthur Balbaert (1879–1938): Belgian sports shooter
- Georges Beaucourt (1912–2002): football player
- Alain Bondue (1959–): racing cyclist
- Saoussen Boudiaf (1993–): sabre fencer
- Michel Breistroff (1971–1996): ice hockey playe
- Jacques Carette (1947–): athlete
- David Coulibaly (1978–): football player
- Charles Crupelandt (1886–1955): Wattrelos-born professional road bicycle racer
- Aliou Dia (1990–): football player
- Yero Dia (1982–): football player
- Pierre Dréossi (1959–): former football player, coach and football manager
- Raymond Dubly (1893–1988): football player
- Pierrick Gunther (1989–): rugby union player
- Prudent Joye (1913–1980): track and field athlete
- Seïd Khiter (1985–): football player
- Anthony Knockaert (1991–): football player
- Christophe Landrin (1977–): football midfielder
- Jean-Christian Lang (1950–): football manager and former player
- René Libeer (1934–2006): boxer
- Christoffer Mafoumbi (1994–): football goalkeeper
- Martial Mbandjock (1985–): sprinter
- Icham Mouissi (1982–): Algerian football player
- Moussa Niakhaté (1996–): football player
- Gonzague Olivier (1921–2013): racing driver
- Fatiha Ouali (1974–): race walker
- Idir Ouali (1988–): football player
- Jacques-Olivier Paviot (1976–): football player
- Jacques Pollet (1922–1997): racing driver
- Antoine Roussel (1989–): ice hockey player
- Daouda Sow (1983–): boxer
- Ahmed Touba (1998–): football player
- Arnaud Tournant (1978–): track cyclist

=== Politicians ===
- Marie-Christine Blandin (1952–): politician, member of the Senate of France, representing the Nord department
- Karima Delli (1979–): politician, Member of the European Parliament
- André Diligent (1919–2002): lawyer and politician, World War II resistance activist, deputy to the National Assembly, senator-mayor of Roubaix
- Jules Guesde (1845–1922): Paris-born socialist journalist and politician, deputy of the constituency of Roubaix to the National Assembly
- Olivier Henno (1962–): politician, mayor of Saint-André-lez-Lille and general councillor
- Pierre Herman (1910–1990): politician, deputy to the National Assembly
- Jean-Baptiste Lebas (1898–1944): politician, mayor of Roubaix, deputy to the National Assembly, World War I and II resistance activist, died in deportation custody
- Louis Loucheur (1872–1931): writer and politician, deputy to the National Assembly
- Auguste Mimerel (1786–1871), industrialist and politician
- Florence Morlighem (1970–): politician, Member of Parliament
- Eugène Motte (1860–1932): politician and businessman, mayor of Roubaix, deputy to the National Assembly
- Pierre Pflimlin (1907–2000): lawyer and politician, last Prime Minister of the Fourth Republic
- Pierre Pribetich (1956–): politician, former Member of the European Parliament
- Jean Prouvost (1885–1978): businessman, media owner and politician
- Raymond Schmittlein (1904–1974): toponymist and politician, deputy to the National Assembly
- Alex Türk (1950–): politician, member of the Senate of France, representing the Nord department

=== Resistance fighters ===
- Marie Léonie Vanhoutte (1888–1967): French resistance fighter and secret-agent during World War I.
- Marcel Verfaillie (1911–1945): communist militant, World War II resistance activist against Nazism, died in concentration camp.

=== Businesspeople ===
- Bernard Arnault (1949–): business magnate, investor and art collector
- Gérard Mulliez (1931–): businessman, founder of the Auchan chain of department stores
- Théodore Vienne (1864–1921): textile manufacturer and co-founder of Paris–Roubaix cycle race
- Pierre Wibaux (1858–1913): cattle-rancher, banker and gold-mine owner, emigrated from France to the United States

=== Scientists ===
- Bernard Amadei (1954–): professor of civil engineering at the University of Colorado, founder of Engineers Without Borders (USA)
- Stanislas Dehaene (1965–): cognitive psychologist, professor at the Collège de France and author
- Marguerite Dupire (1920–2015): ethnologist
- Robert Jonckhèere (1888–1974): astronomer
- Dominique Mulliez (1952–): epigrapher, archaeologist and Hellenist
- Joseph Willot (1875–1919): pharmacist and World War I resistance activist

=== Writers and journalists ===
- Richard Cobb (1917–1996): British social historian. Lived in Roubaix in the 1940s.
- Yanette Delétang-Tardif (1902–1976): poet
- Marie Desplechin (1959–): writer and journalist
- Robert Diligent (1924–2014): journalist, founding members of Télé Luxembourg
- Benoît Duquesne (1957–2014): journalist, television reporter and newscaster
- Jules Feller (1859–1940): Romance linguist and philologist, Belgian academician and Walloon militant
- Bruno Masure (1947–): journalist, news anchor and television presenter
- Amédée Prouvost (1877–1909): poet
- Maxence Van Der Meersch (1907–1951): writer

=== Other ===
- Ferdinand Bonnel (1865–1945): Jesuit priest and missionary in Sri Lanka
- Jean-Luc Brunin (1951–): clergyman, bishop of the Roman Catholic Diocese of Le Havre
- Antoine Cordonnier (1892–1918): military aviator, flying ace during World War I
- Jean-Robert de Cavel (1961–2022): French-American chef de cuisine
- Jean Desbouvrie (c. 1840–1847-?): inventor and bird tamer
- Jules Dumont (1888–1943): communist militant, commanded the Commune de Paris Battalion, a unit part of the XI International Brigade
- Francis Pollet (1964–): general officer
- Gérard Vachonfrance (1933–2008): physician and society co-founder
- Charles Vanden Bosch (1883–1945): Belgian Roman Catholic Franciscan priest, founder of the Belgian National work for the Blind, died in concentration camp

== See also ==
- Paris–Roubaix
- André Diligent Museum of Art and Industry
- Canal of Roubaix
- Roubaix, South Dakota
- André Bizette-Lindet
