= Jean Desbouvrie =

French amateur bird trainer

- Born: February 18, 1843; Roubaix, France
- Died: August 18, 1905 (aged 62); Roubaix, France
- Known for: Research in the usage of swallows for military communications
- Scientific career
- Fields: Zoology; alcoholism

Jean Desbouvrie (18 February 1843 – 18 August 1905) was a French amateur bird trainer who believed that swallows could be put to use for military communications. During the late 19th century Desbouvrie persuaded the government of France to conduct a study on the feasibility of using swallows as messengers. His early demonstrations showed that swallows could exhibit homing behavior and that when they did so they flew much faster than homing pigeons. Desbouvrie also succeeded in curbing the birds' natural migratory behavior. After obtaining authorization from the government for follow-up testing, Desbouvrie delayed and did not follow through with rigorous experimentation.

Desbouvrie received international attention in the press for two unrelated reasons: the bird experiments, and also for a proposal he made to the Paris Academy of Medicine. The Academy published his paper, which declared chronic alcoholism to be a serious public health problem and offered a solution in the form of a claimed cure for hangovers. Desbouvrie hypothesized that the consumption of food which contained an appropriate balance of fat and albumen would prevent hangovers from occurring. He sent the Academy a selection of homemade chocolates along with his manuscript, with assurances that he had tested the concoction extensively upon himself.

== Youth ==
Jean Desbouvrie born Jean Baptiste Desbouvrie, was the son of Frédéric Joseph Desbouvrie, servant, fruit merchant and Catherine Joseph Derain, housewife, and was born in the "Hameau du Triez Saint-Joseph" in Roubaix.

== Swallow training ==
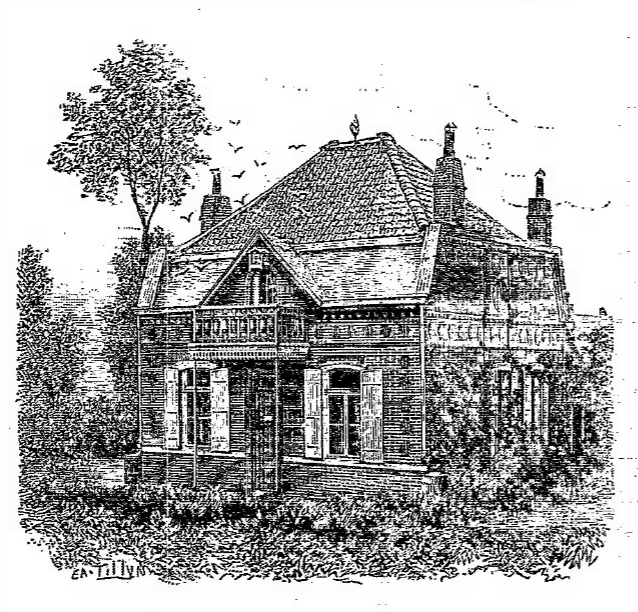
The house on the quai de la Vigne where Desbouvrie kept his swallows

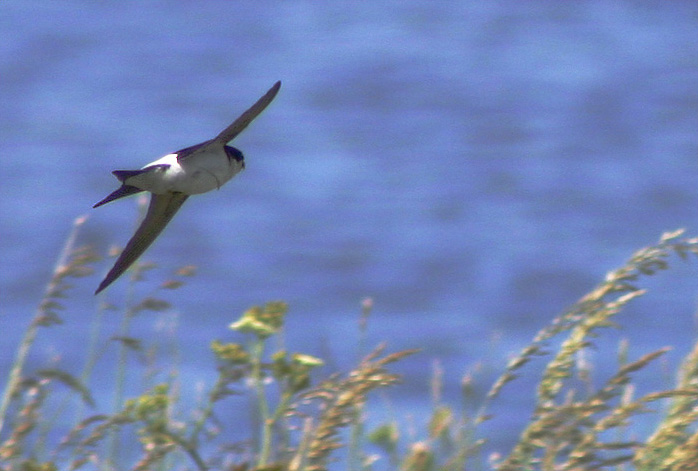
Swallows in flight

Jean Desbouvrie then lived in a house on the quai de la Vigne (currently quai de Rouen) at the edge of the Canal de Roubaix near the pont de la Vigne (also known as pont Salembier) in the "Hameau de la Grande Vigne.

Desbouvrie kept his swallows in a cage and trained them to fly in and out of the cage. Another challenge he overcame was the birds' natural migratory behavior. Desbouvrie believed that swallows migrated southward because the supply of insects for them to feed upon dwindled in winter; he refused to make public disclosure of what he fed the birds in wintertime, regarding that as a trade secret. Later attempts to train homing behavior into migratory birds determined that the birds have no instinctive knowledge of where to fly when the season changes, so if the normal migratory pattern is disrupted during the first year of life the individual does not migrate afterward.

He spent over 30 years keeping birds and devoted two rooms of his house to swallows. One room housed a cage for the swallows. The other room was a training space with a balcony used for practice releases. He documented the age and health of each bird in a register, and marked each one by tying colored silk to its leg, with red indicating a trained bird and blue indicating a partially trained bird. Trained swallows were allowed to roam outside their cages, while the others remained caged at all times. Untrained birds were sold as pets.

Desbouvrie participated in the Exposition Universelle of 1889 in front of the War Palace located in the Esplanade des Invalides:

Four of the little prisoners, the oldest not more than twenty days, were let loose. It was raining in torrents at the moment, a circumstance by no means favorable to the trial. The birds rose in the air, flew round the house several times, and then darted off into the country. Twenty-five minutes after the youngest returned and perched on the balcony; the other three did not come back before an hour. They all then entered the cage-room, when Desbouvrie gave them some food, which they ate out of his hand.

In 1889, during the International Farmyard Animal Contest of Bergues, he received a silver-gilt medal and an honorary diploma for his work on war swallows.

== Potential applications of swallow training ==
The 1955 book Bird Navigation describes efforts at training homing behavior in species other than pigeons. Bird Navigation mentions Desbouvrie as an early experimenter, and also a passage from Pliny the Elder in which "Caecina of Volterra" (possibly Caecina Paetus) used painted swallows to report the colors of winning horses in a race.

Carrier pigeons had been a significant factor in communications during the Franco-Prussian War of 1870. An 1892 report in The American Magazine that discussed Desbouvrie's efforts noted the importance of pigeons to that war: "Upon several occasions, indeed, the inhabitants of the beleaguered cities looked upon the successful flights of these birds as their only hope betwixt death and starvation."

By the late 19th century Russia was training military falcons, possibly to carry messages or else to hunt the war pigeons. Swallows offered several advantages over pigeons if training could succeed. Swallows fly higher and faster, and are more difficult for marksmen to shoot or for birds of prey to intercept. Swallows are also able to feed during flight.

== Government interest ==
Proposed architectural design for a French military aviary to house swallows as messenger birds, 1889

As a demonstration, Desbouvrie brought an untamed swallow from the Roubaix area to Paris and released it. The bird returned to its home 258 kilometers away in 90 minutes. Desbouvrie promised that trained swallows would provide even better speeds. The governor of Lille oversaw testing near Roubaix and a military engineer named Captain Degouy was ordered to oversee a duplication of the Roubaix experiments.

Desbouvrie proposed two swallow aviaries at Montmartre and at Fort Mont-Valérien. The Montmartre cote was scheduled to be constructed first, if Captain Degouy confirmed the results and recommended further training. A report from The Globe stated that Desbouvrie believed all his birds were too young for full testing and required additional training. The American Magazine noted that Desbouvrie did not breed his birds and obtained them all as nestlings, although he promised he could breed them easily if he wanted to do so. Over half a century later P.W. Brian stated in Bird Navigation that Desbouvrie "appeared to be unwilling to demonstrate them."

The Globe published a favorable report of Desbouvrie's efforts, although noting that further testing was needed. The Zoologist republished the Globe report with a note that Zoologist editors "have no faith in the idea that the experiment will succeed in his object." The American Magazine dismissed the project with the statement, "The idea of engaging swallows in war is a pretty one, as, in future, all European wars will have to be conducted in 'swallow time'—when the warm winds blow from the sunny south."

== Academy of Medicine presentation ==
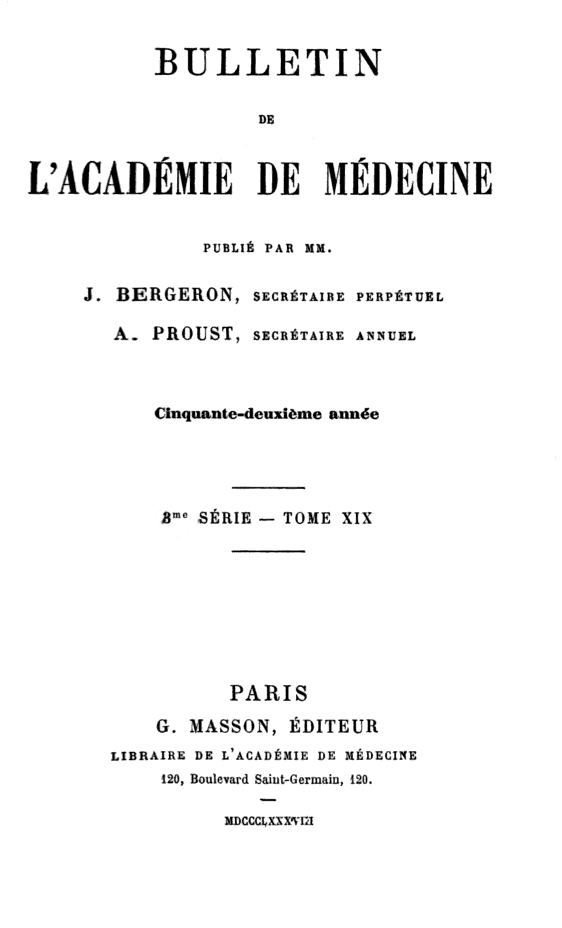
Cover page to the medical bulletin that first reported Desbouvrie's claimed discovery of a preventive cure for hangovers

In 1888 the Bulletin de l'academie de medicine (Bulletin of the Academy of Medicine) published a report that Desbouvrie had sent them a manuscript and requested verification of an invention he claimed to have made. He called it was a matter of public health to counter the effects of chronic alcoholism. According to the report, which was republished in English in summary form in the Medical Record and the Cincinnati Lancet-clinic, Desbouvrie had attempted a preventive cure for hangovers. Desbouvrie asserted that the cure required eating albumen and fat in appropriate proportions one hour before alcohol consumption, and had invented a chocolate which he claimed contained both ingredients in an effective ratio. He provided samples to the Academy and assured its members he had tested the cure upon himself.

== Honors ==
- Honorary diploma and silver-gilt medal at the Bergues International Barnyard Animal Contest 1889.

== See also ==
- Homing pigeon – Pigeons bred to find their way home
- Pigeon keeping – Animal husbandry of domestic pigeons
