= Carette =

Carette is a surname. Notable people with the surname include:

- Amélie Carette (1839–1926), French memoirist
- Bruno Carette (1956–1989), French humorist
- Henri Carette (1846–1911), French politician
- Jacques Carette (born 1947), French athlete
- José Carrette de Julián (born 1951), Spanish footballer
- Julien Carette (1897–1966), French actor
- Pierre Carette (born 1952), former leader of the Belgian extreme-left militant group CCC

== See also ==
- Caretta
