= Marque (river) =

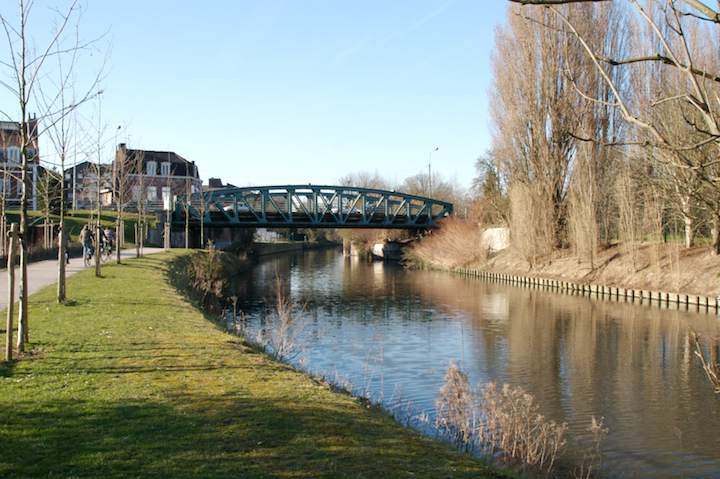

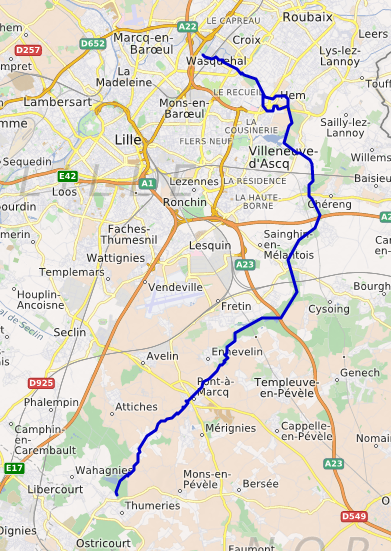

Location
- Country: France

Physical characteristics
- Source
  - location: Nord
- Mouth: Deûle
  - coordinates: 50°40′26″N 3°3′44″E
- Length: 40 km (25 mi)
- Basin size: 215 km^{2} (83 mi^{2})

Basin features
- Progression: Deûle→ Lys→ Scheldt→ North Sea

The Marque (French pronunciation: [maʁk]; Dutch: Marke) is a 40-kilometre (25 mi) long river in France. It is a right tributary of the Deûle. Its source is near the village of Mons-en-Pévèle. Its course crosses the Nord department, notably the eastern part of the agglomeration of Lille. It flows northwards through the towns of Pont-à-Marcq, Tressin, Villeneuve d'Ascq, Croix and Marcq-en-Barœul, finally flowing into the Deûle in Marquette-lez-Lille. Its lowermost section, between Wasquehal and Marquette-lez-Lille, is part of the 20-km long Canal de Roubaix.
