= Rémy Cogghe =

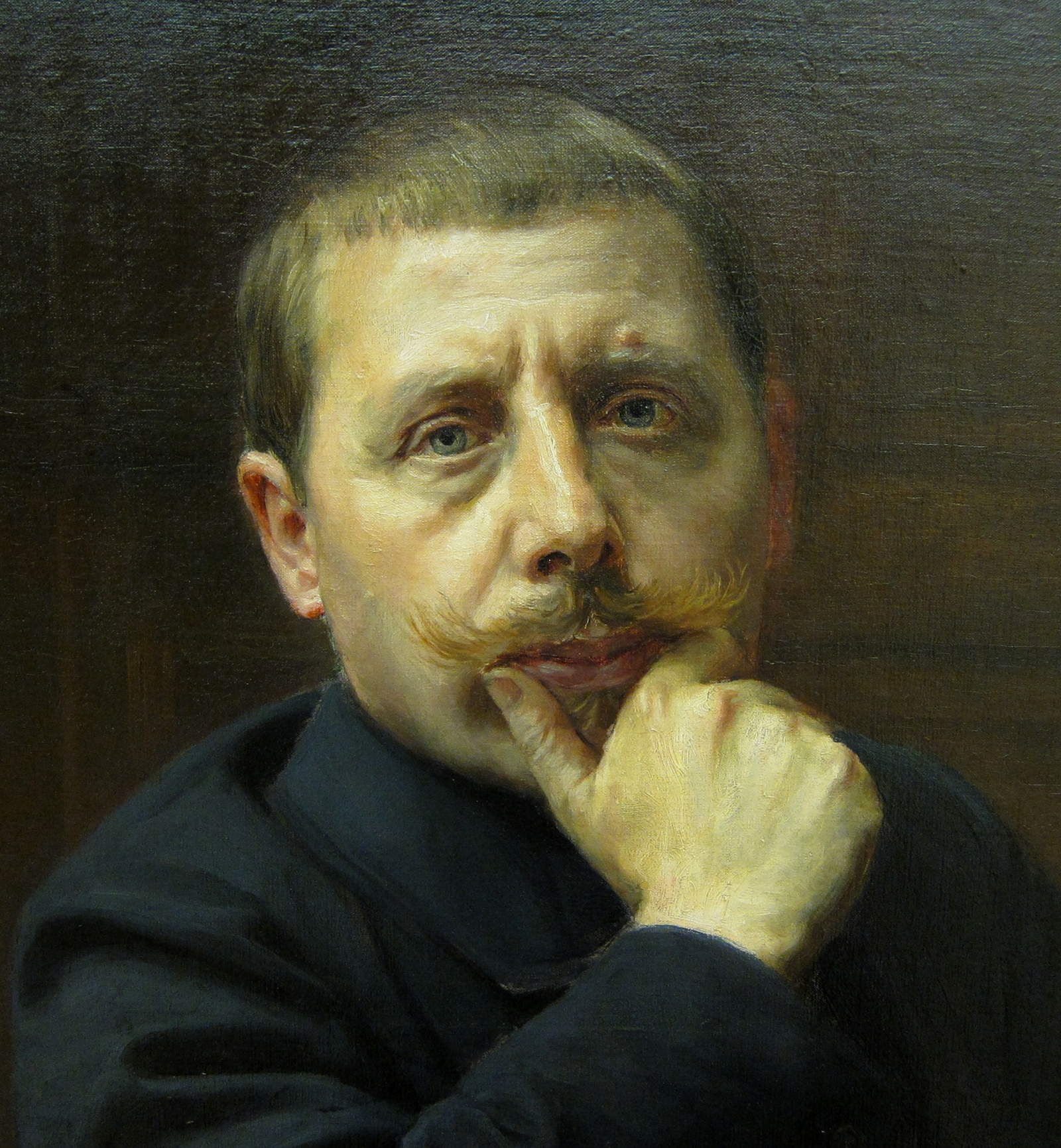
- Self-portrait (1913)
- Born: Rémy Cogghe; 31 October 1854; Mouscron, Belgium
- Died: 2 April 1935 (aged 80); Roubaix, France
- Education: École des Beaux-arts
- Occupation: Painter

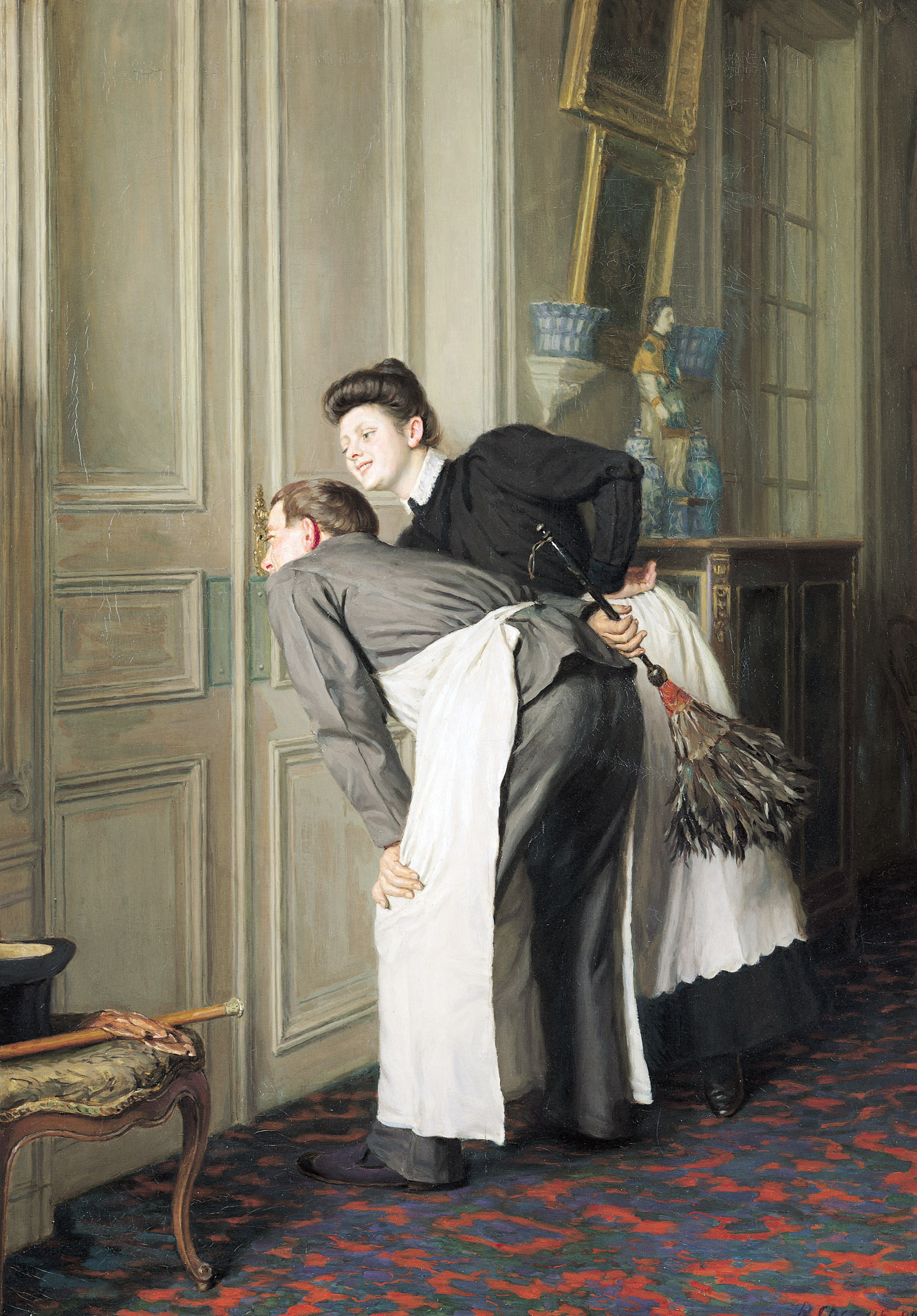
Madame Is Receiving (1908)

Rémy Cogghe, originally spelled Rémi Coghe ( 31 October 1854 – 2 April 1935) was a Belgian-born painter, residing in France.

== Biography ==
He was born in Mouscron. When he was thirteen, his father moved the family to France to take a job as a spinner in the industrial town of Roubaix. He took his first art lessons at the local Academy. In 1876, he entered the École des Beaux-arts, where he studied under Alexandre Cabanel. Four years later, he was a candidate for the Prix de Rome, but it was discovered that he was still a Belgian citizen, so he returned to Mouscron, took temporary lodgings and applied for the Prix de Rome (Belgium) from the Royal Academy of Fine Arts (Antwerp). He was awarded the prize in 1879 and received a gold medal for his painting The Aduatuci Sold as Slaves.

Cogghe spent the next five years travelling extensively throughout Spain and Italy, with visits to Algeria and Tunisia, painting prolifically all the way. In 1885, he returned to Roubaix and moved in with his parents. By 1893, he had become successful enough that he could afford to build his own house. He specialized in portraits, but also painted scenes from the daily life of Roubaix and the surrounding region. Between 1879 and 1926, he exhibited in the foreign section at the Salon twenty-nine times.

Cogghe died on 2 April 1935 in Roubaix.

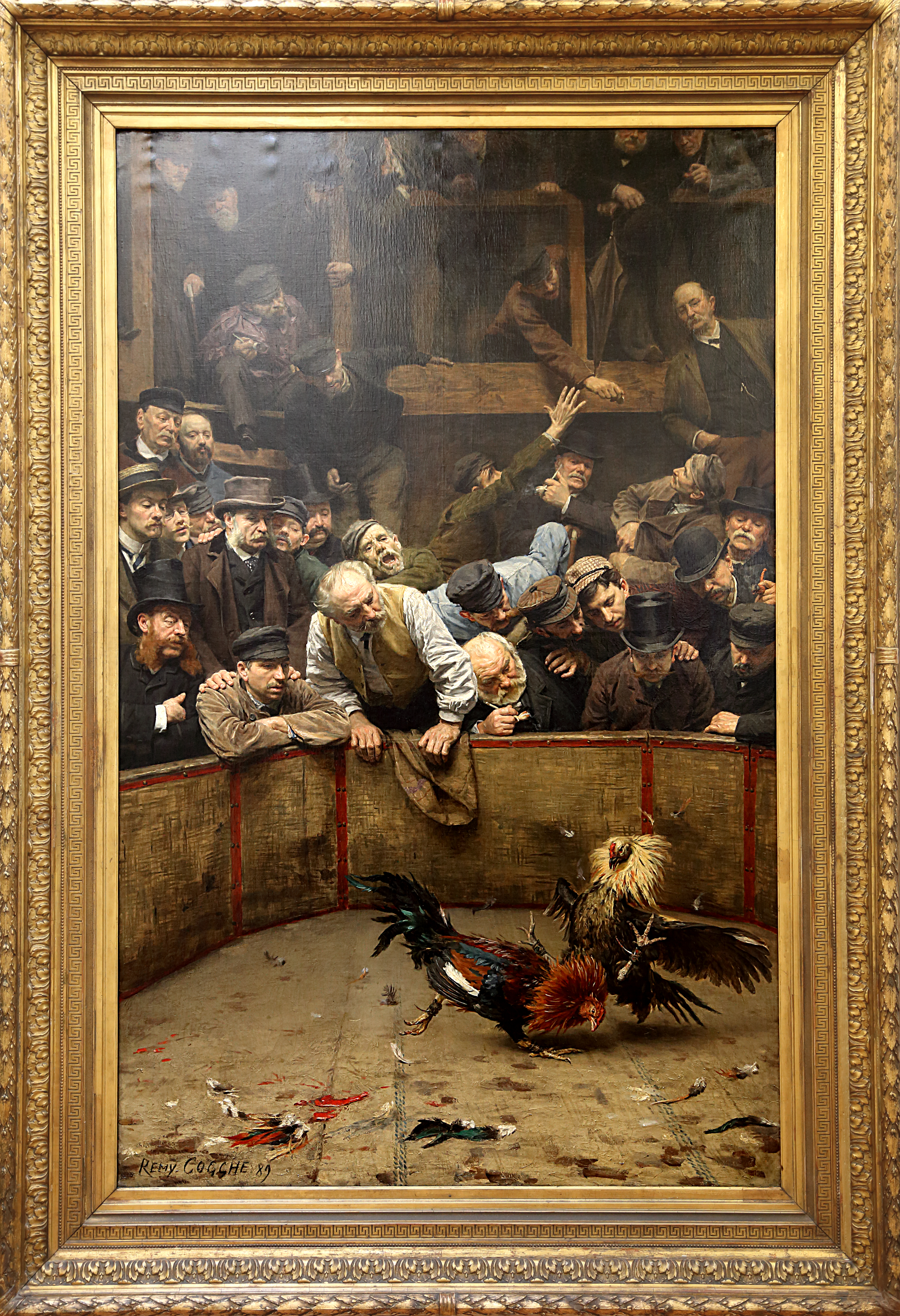

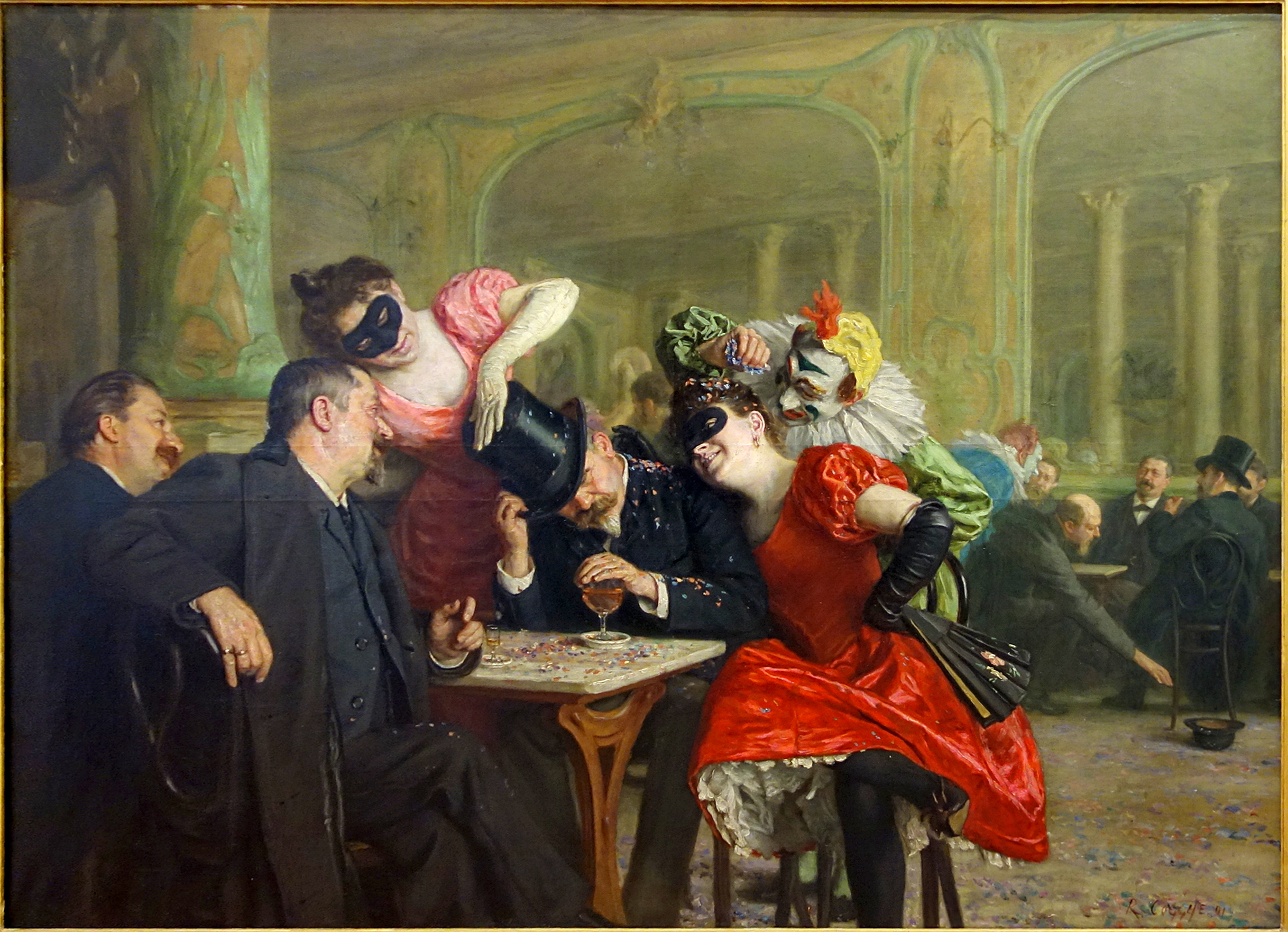

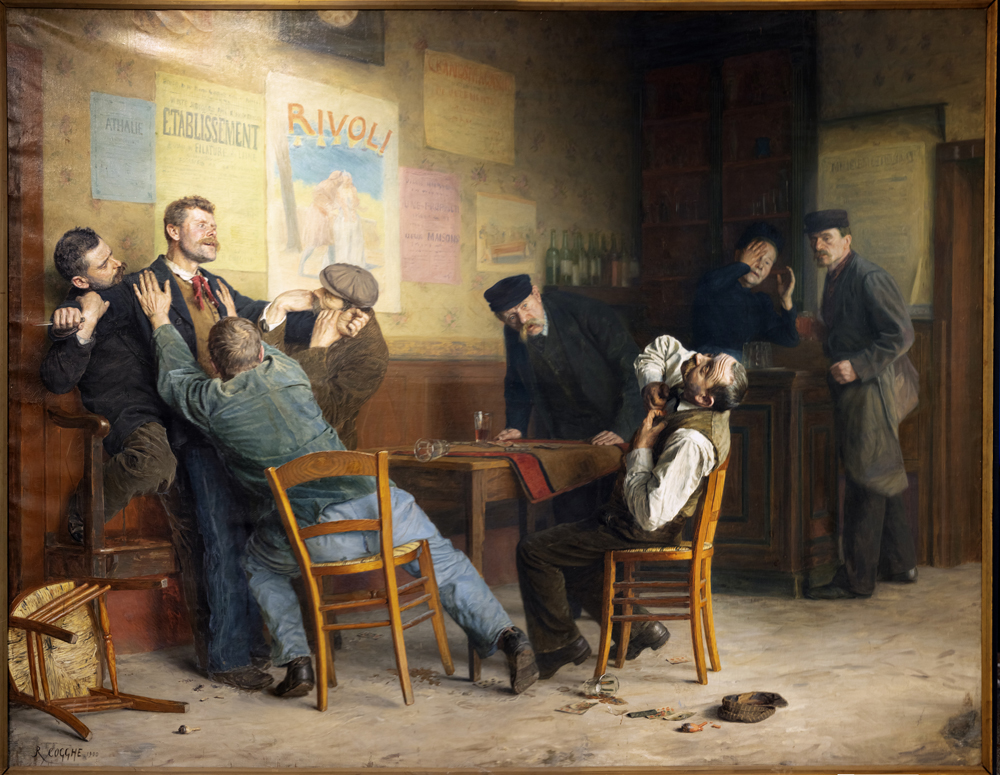

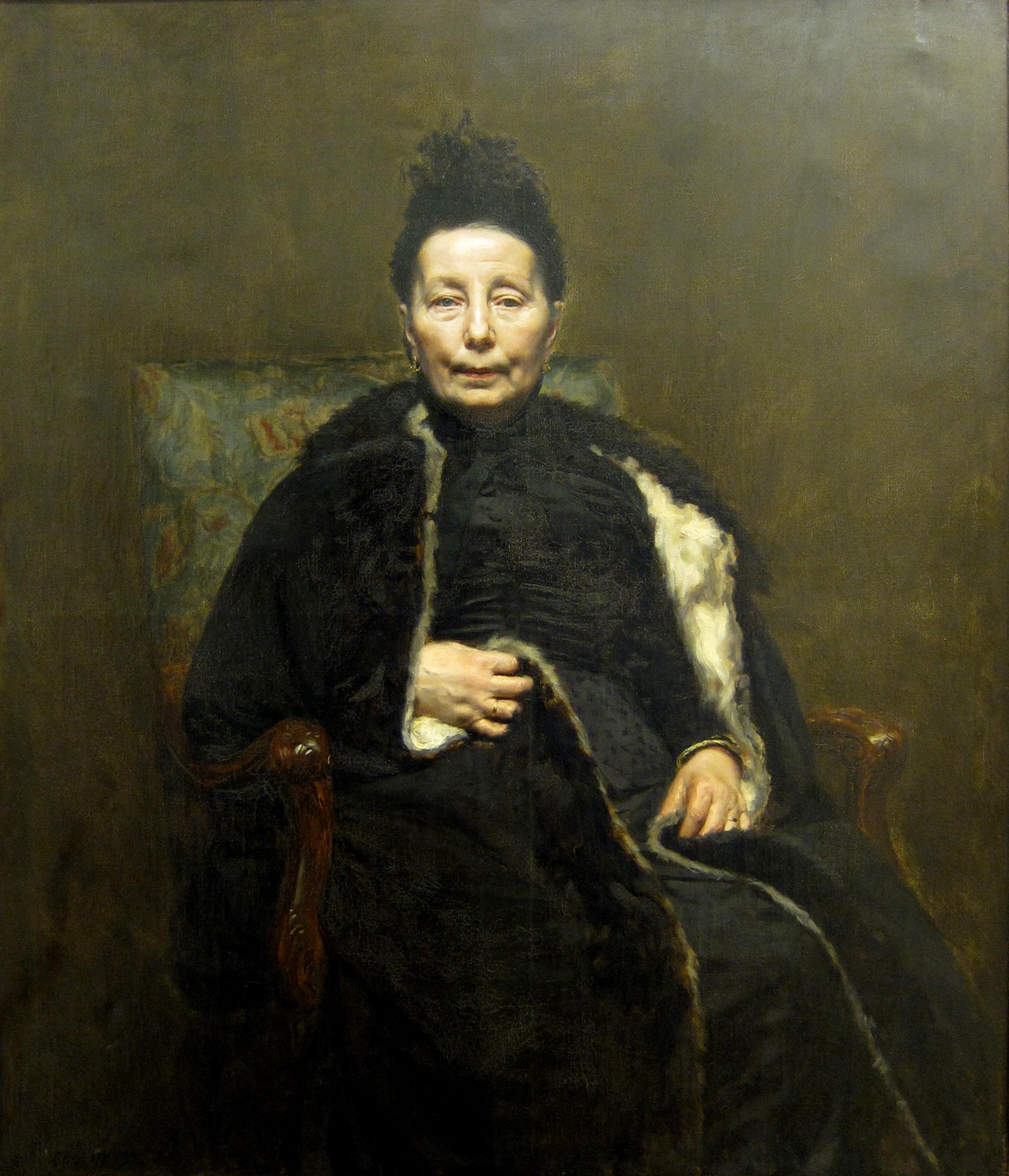
