= Joseph Willot =

French pharmacist (1876–1919)

- Born: 1876
- Died: 1 April 1919 (aged 42–43); Roubaix, France
- Known for: French Resistance
- Spouse: Marie Therese Helbecque
- Scientific career
- Fields: Pharmacology
- Workplaces: Catholic University of Lille

Joseph Willot (1876–1919) was a French pharmacist at the Catholic University of Lille and was known as a member of the French Resistance in World War I and member of the Legion d'Honneur.

== Resistance work ==
In 1914, he was invited by Firmin Dubar, a businessman from Roubaix, and Abbe Jules Pinte, a priest and teacher of chemistry at the Roubaix Technical Institute, to join them in spreading information from the free part of France to the areas under German occupation.

Willot initially helped distribute Fr. Pinte's newsletters in Roubaix, and then from February 1915, began to produce newspapers for Lille, with a printing press in his laboratory at the rue du Vieil Abreuvoir. The underground journals had several successive names (L'Oiseau de France, La Patience, La Voix de la Patrie, etc.) until the network was discovered in 1916. Willot's wife joined the activities, writing a column aimed at the wives and mothers of French soldiers. Joseph Willot and his two partners were sentenced to ten years' imprisonment in Rheinbach, Germany. Willot was released after the Armistice, but died on 1 April 1919, having become ill in prison. He was made a posthumous member of the Legion d'Honneur.
