= Henri Carette =

French socialist politician (1846–1911)

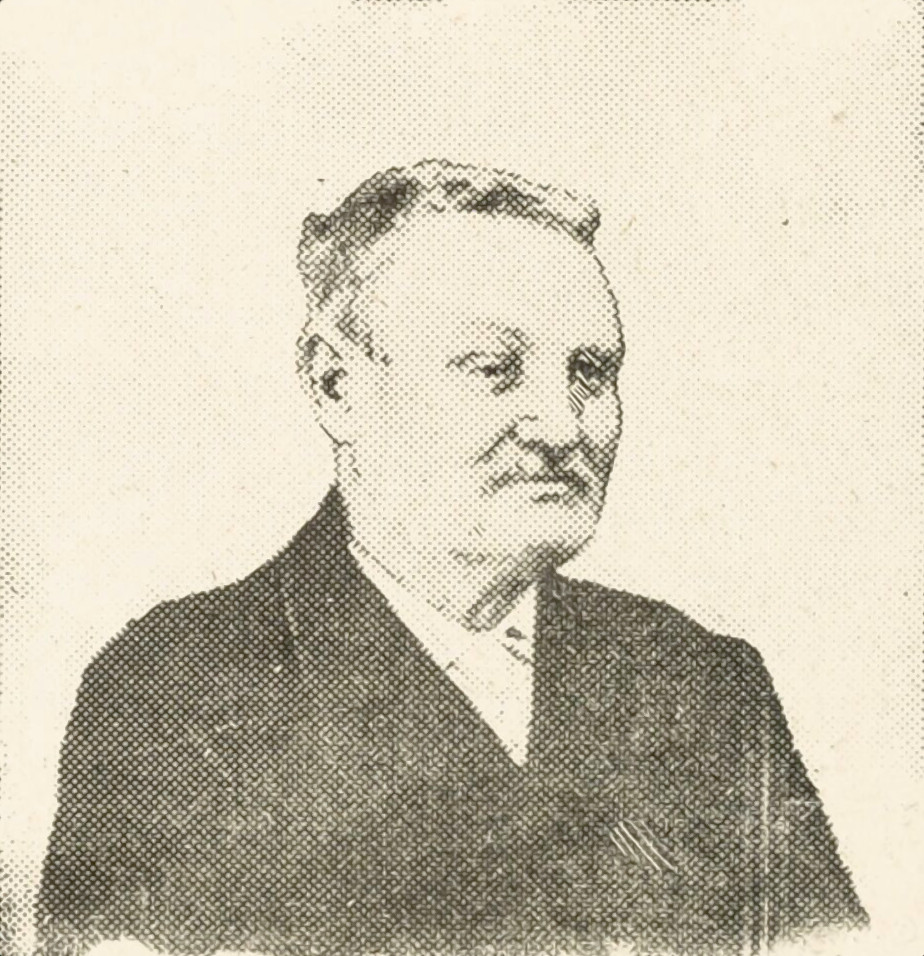
Newspaper photo of Carette

Henri Carette (25 January 1846 – 23 June 1911 in Paris) was a French politician. He was a member of the general council of the department of Nord and the first socialist mayor of Roubaix.

Carette was the son of a weaver and was himself a weaver at the beginning of his working life, before becoming a café proprietor (cabaretier) and newspaper seller. He was a collectivist and a member of the French Workers' Party (Parti ouvrier français), of which he managed the press organ Le Forçat. He organised the party's local section in the Alma district of Roubaix, near his café He served as conseiller général of the Nord department from 1892 to 1895 and as the first socialist mayor of Roubaix from 15 May 1892 to 17 December 1901. He was buried in Roubaix, where his tomb bears as an inscription the opening words of the Internationale: "Debout, les damnés de la terre".
