= Roubaix Canal =

Canal in northern France

Coordinates: 50°41′N 3°04′E

Canal de Roubaix

Specifications
- Length: 20 km (12 mi)
- Locks: 12

Geography
- Start point: Marquette-lez-Lille
- End point: Roubaix

The Canal de Roubaix (French pronunciation: [kanal də ʁubɛ]) is a canal in northern France. It joins the Canal de la Deûle near Marquette-lez-Lille to the Canal de l’Espierres in Belgium at Leers, just east of the former textile manufacturing town Roubaix. It is 20 km long with 12 locks. The Belgian canal continues 8.4 km and three locks beyond the border to the junction with the river Escaut (Scheldt).

The canal fell into disuse in 1985 and was going to be infilled for an urban expressway. Instead, the canal was repaired and reopened in September 2009. The first normal operating season, after dredging works on the Belgian canal, was 2011.

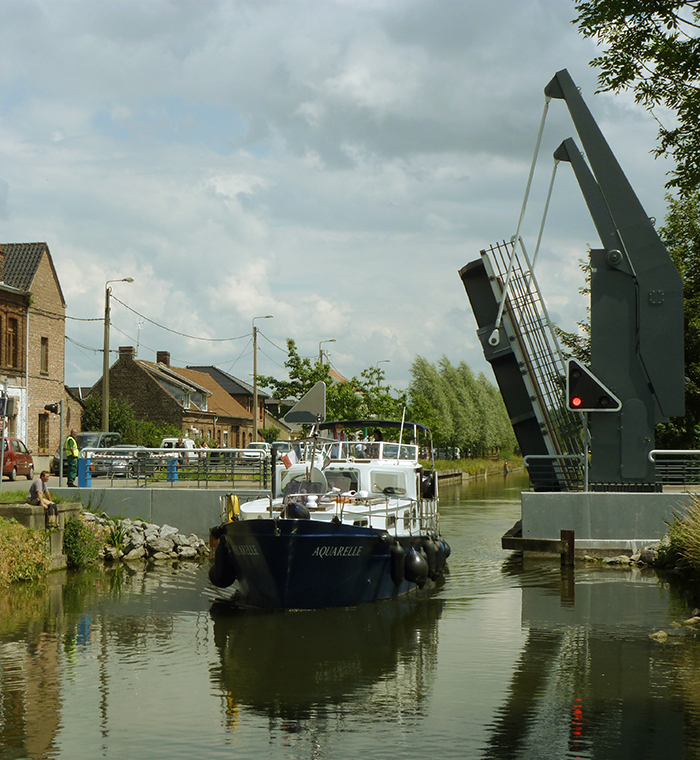
The 17m-long motor yacht Aquarelle passes through the Grimonpont draw bridge on the recently reopened canal

== Navigation ==
The canal has been found by all boat owners who use it to be a surprisingly picturesque navigation, considering the industrial character of much of the route and the economic decline suffered by the population for decades. The summit level is part of the vast urban regeneration area of L'Union, in Tourcoing and Roubaix. As forecast by the initiators of the restoration project, the reopened canal has injected new life and a sense of pride in this part of the local industrial heritage. Locks and moveable bridges are operated by staff of the Lille metropolitan authority MEL (Métropole_Européenne_de_Lille).

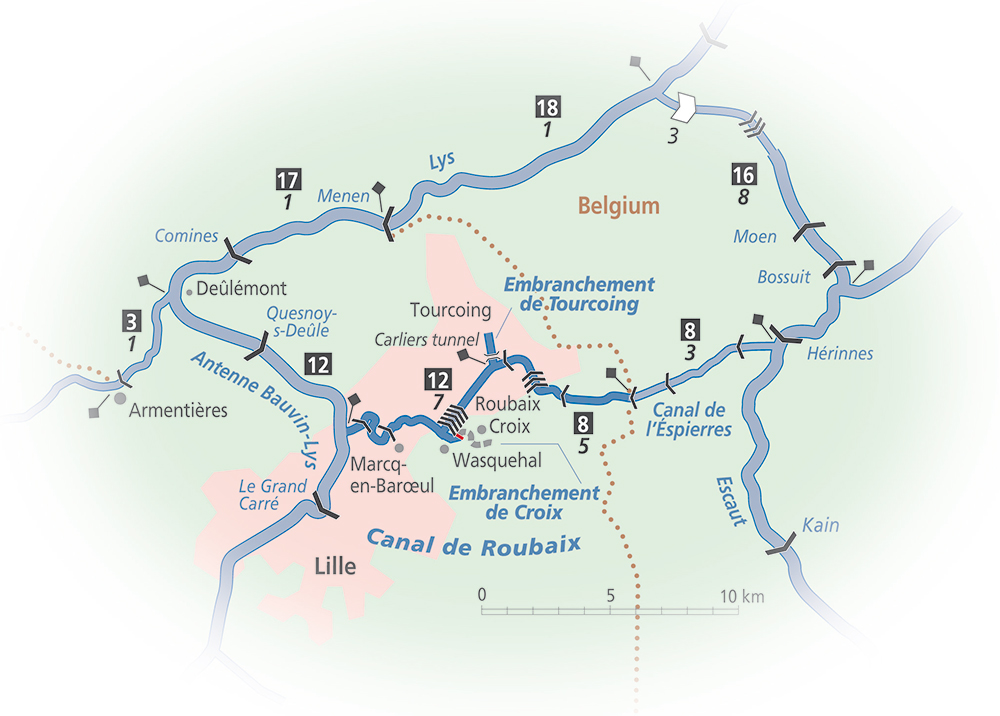
Map of the Canal de Roubaix and connecting waterways, from Inland Waterways of France

== See also ==
- Canal de Roubaix with further maps and expanded details (by the author of Inland Waterways of France)
- Navigation details for 80 French rivers and canals (French waterways website section)
- List of canals in France
