= Deûle =

River in France

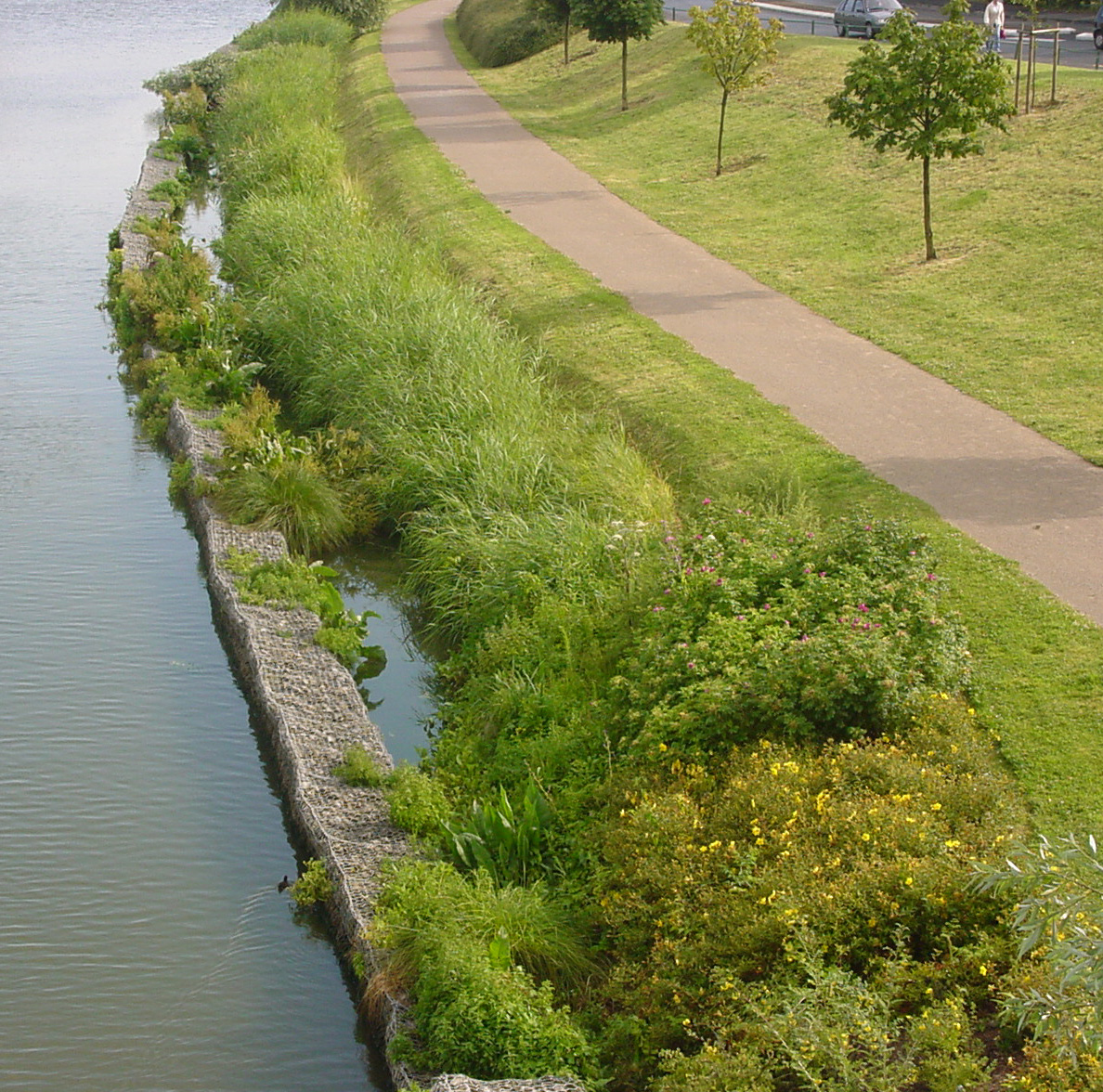
- The Deûle near Bois Blancs

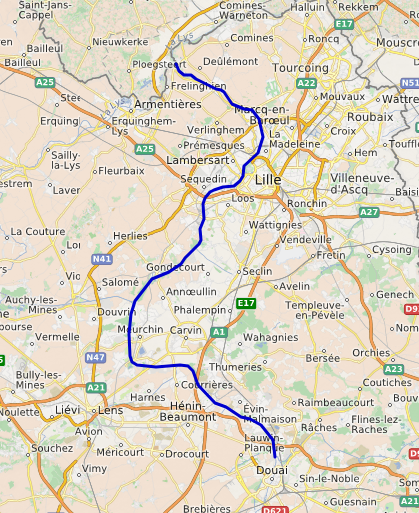

- Location within France Location within Hauts-de-France

Location
- Country: France
- Region: Hauts-de-France

Physical characteristics
- Source
  - location: France
- Mouth
  - location: Lys
  - coordinates: 50°43′52″N 2°56′41″E

Basin features
- Progression: Lys→ Scheldt→ North Sea

The Deûle (French pronunciation: [døl]; Dutch: Deule) is a river of northern France which is channeled for the main part of its course (from Lens to Lille). The upstream part is still partly free-flowing and is known as the Souchez. The Deûle flows into the Lys (right bank) in Deûlémont.

The Souchez is formed from the union, in the village of Souchez, of two smaller brooks, called the Carency and the Saint-Nazaire.

The channeled part comprises two branches:

- the high gauge canal known as Canal de la Deûle which ensures the connection between the channeled Lys and the Scarpe (a tributary of the Scheldt) in Douai,
- the Canal de Lens, fed by the Souchez, which connects Lens with the Canal de la Deûle at Courrières.

Immediately downstream of Lens, the channel is unusually elevated compared to the neighboring banks, as a result of mining depressions.

The Deûle flows through the departments of Pas-de-Calais and Nord, and the towns of Lens, Wingles, Loos, Lille, Wambrechies and Quesnoy-sur-Deûle, before it flows into the Lys at Deûlémont.

The Deûle does not yet profit from a Schéma d'aménagement et de gestion des eaux.

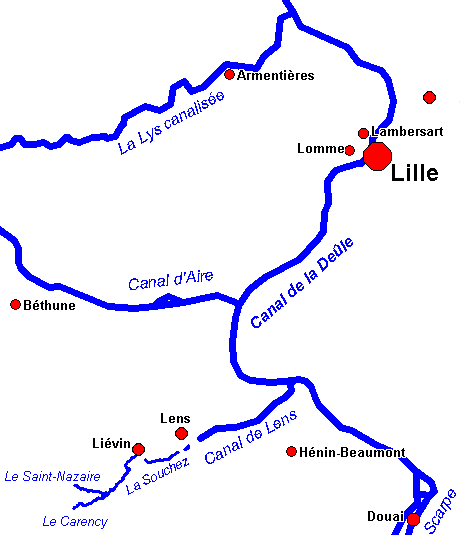
Map of the Deûle
