= Saint-Sébastien Church, Annappes =

Church in Annappes, France

Coordinates: 50°37′36″N 3°09′01″E

Église Saint-Sébastien d'Annappes
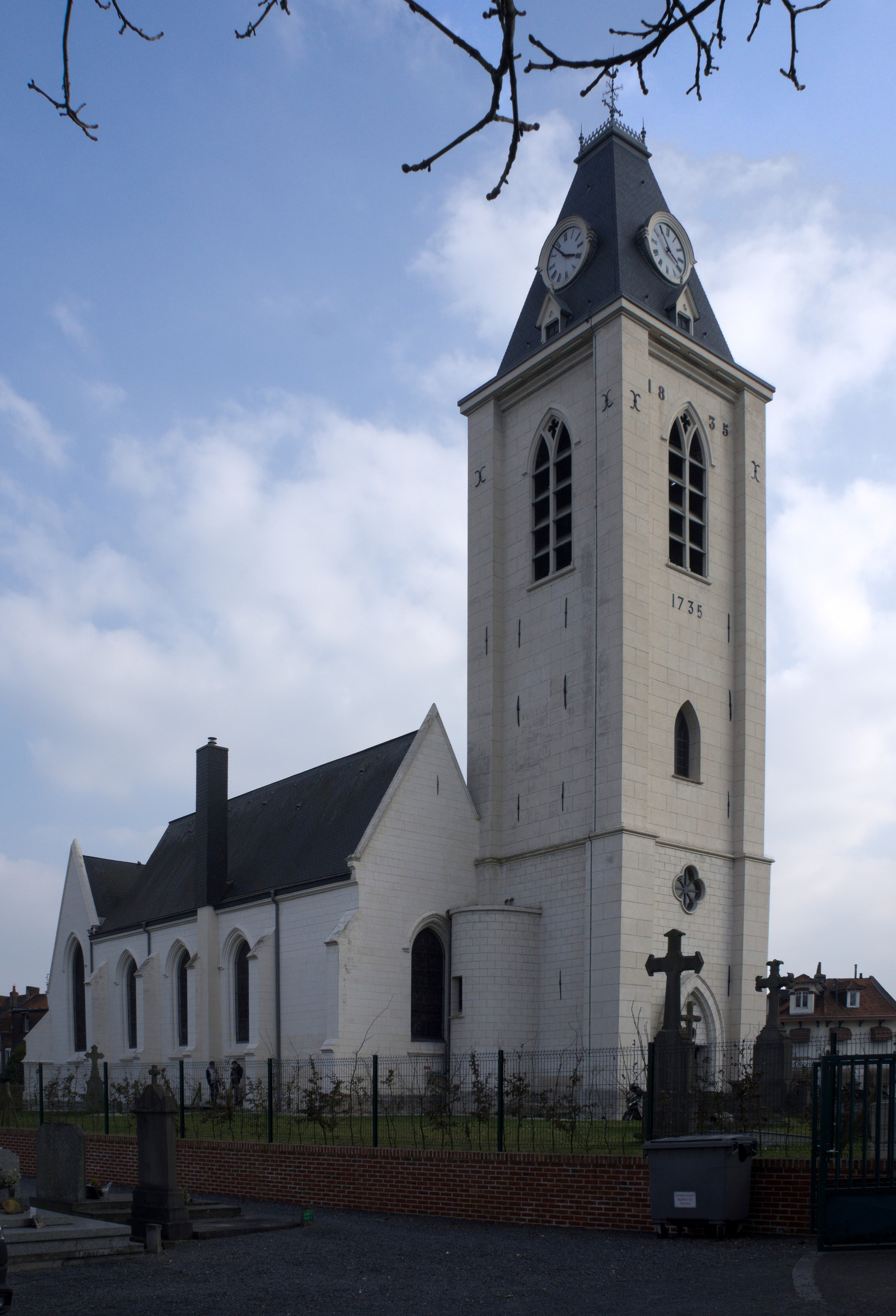
- Saint-Sébastien Church, Annappes

Religion
- Affiliation: Catholicism
- District: Catholic diocese of Lille
- Region: Nord-Pas-de-Calais
- Status: Active

Location
- Location: Annappes, 59491 Villeneuve d'Ascq, France
- Interactive map of Église Saint-Sébastien d'Annappes

Architecture
- Type: Church
- Groundbreaking: 13th century;
- Completed: 1950; 2013

Saint-Sébastien church Catholic church located in the village of Annappes, now part of the commune of Villeneuve-d'Ascq, Nord department, northern France. The church is placed under the patronage of Saint Sebastian, Roman martyr, of whom it houses a relic preserved at the request of the brotherhood of archers of Saint Sebastian founded in 1517.

== Architecture ==
The church would have been built in the 13th century - a dendrochronological analysis of the framework of the Saint-Sébastien church carried out by the University of Besançon dated it to 1291. - Saint-Sébastien church is a hall church with three naves. The timbers of the central nave are dated 1291; the original ceiling has been hidden by a vault since 1929. To the east, the central nave is extended by a choir with an apse with three cut sides, the two collaterals by chapels built in the 18th century. The side gables of its south face, made in the 21st century, are very rare for this period. The current building, made up of blocks cut from Lezennes chalk on a sandstone base.

The church contains an altar designated as a monument historique in 1906, called Autel de Saint-Sébastien, retable et tabernacle.

== Gallery ==
Altar of Saint Sebastian.

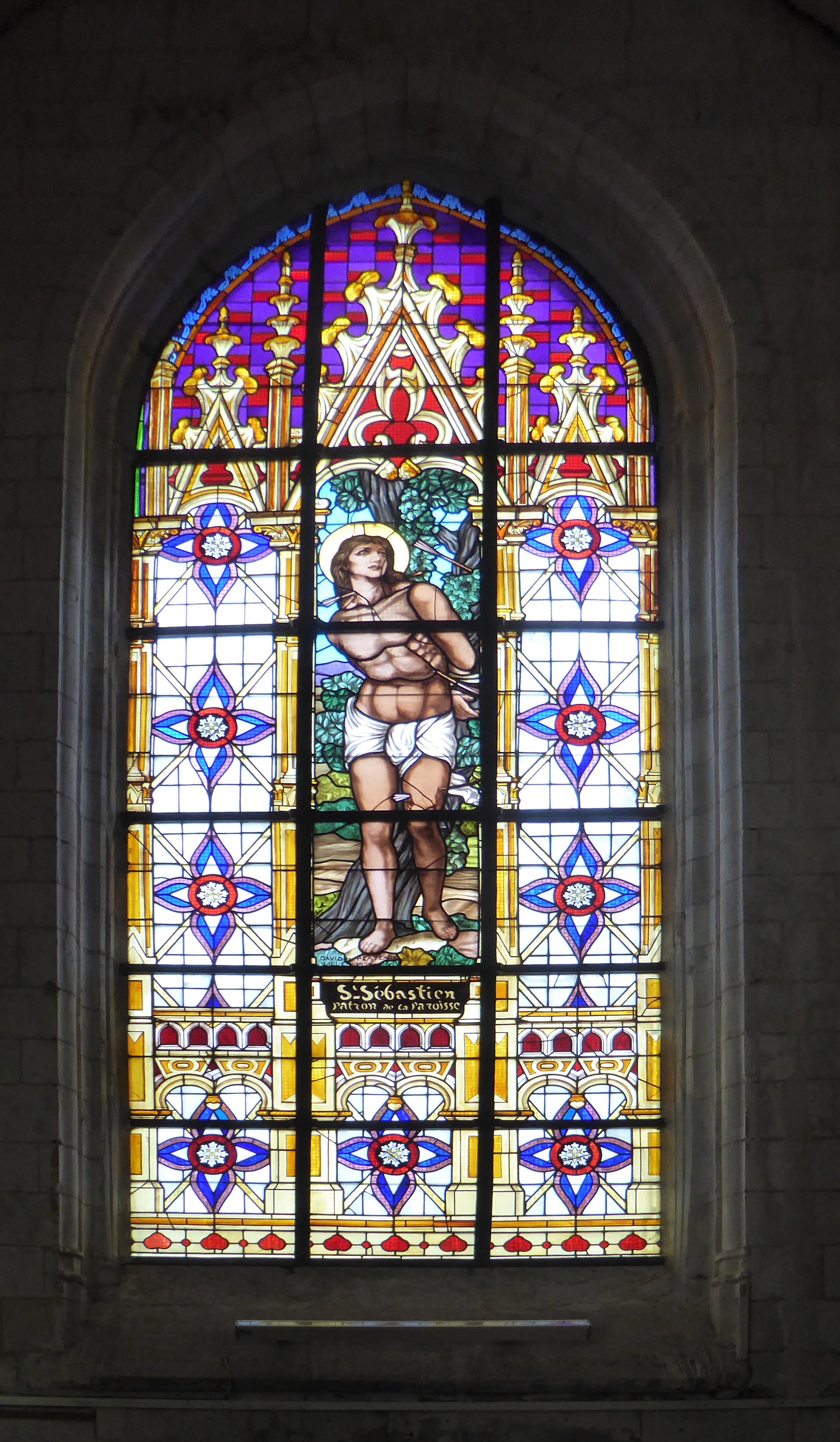
Stained glass window depicting Saint Sebastian.

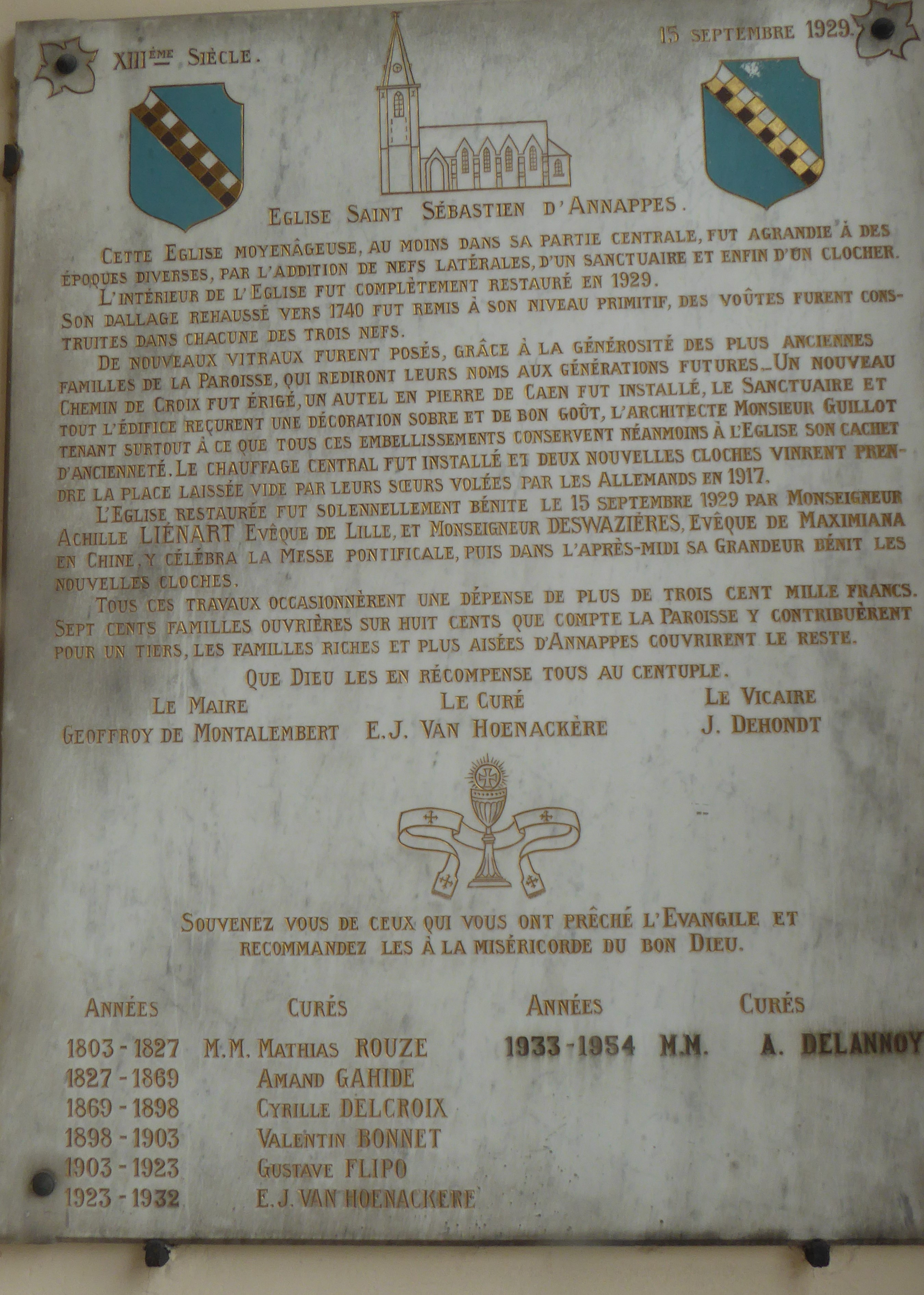
Memorial plaque under the church porch.

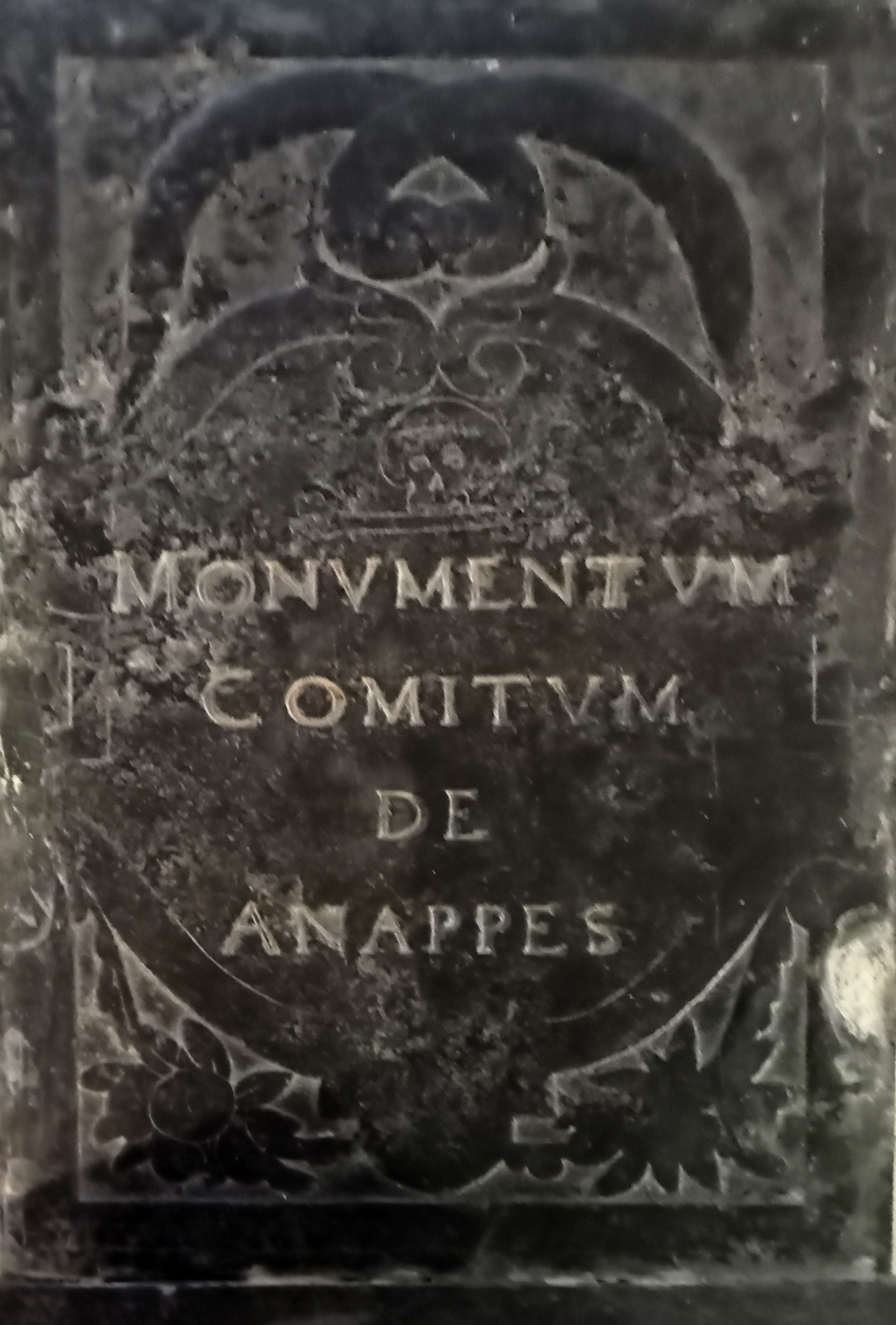
Funerary slab of the first Count of Annappes Jean de Roblès.

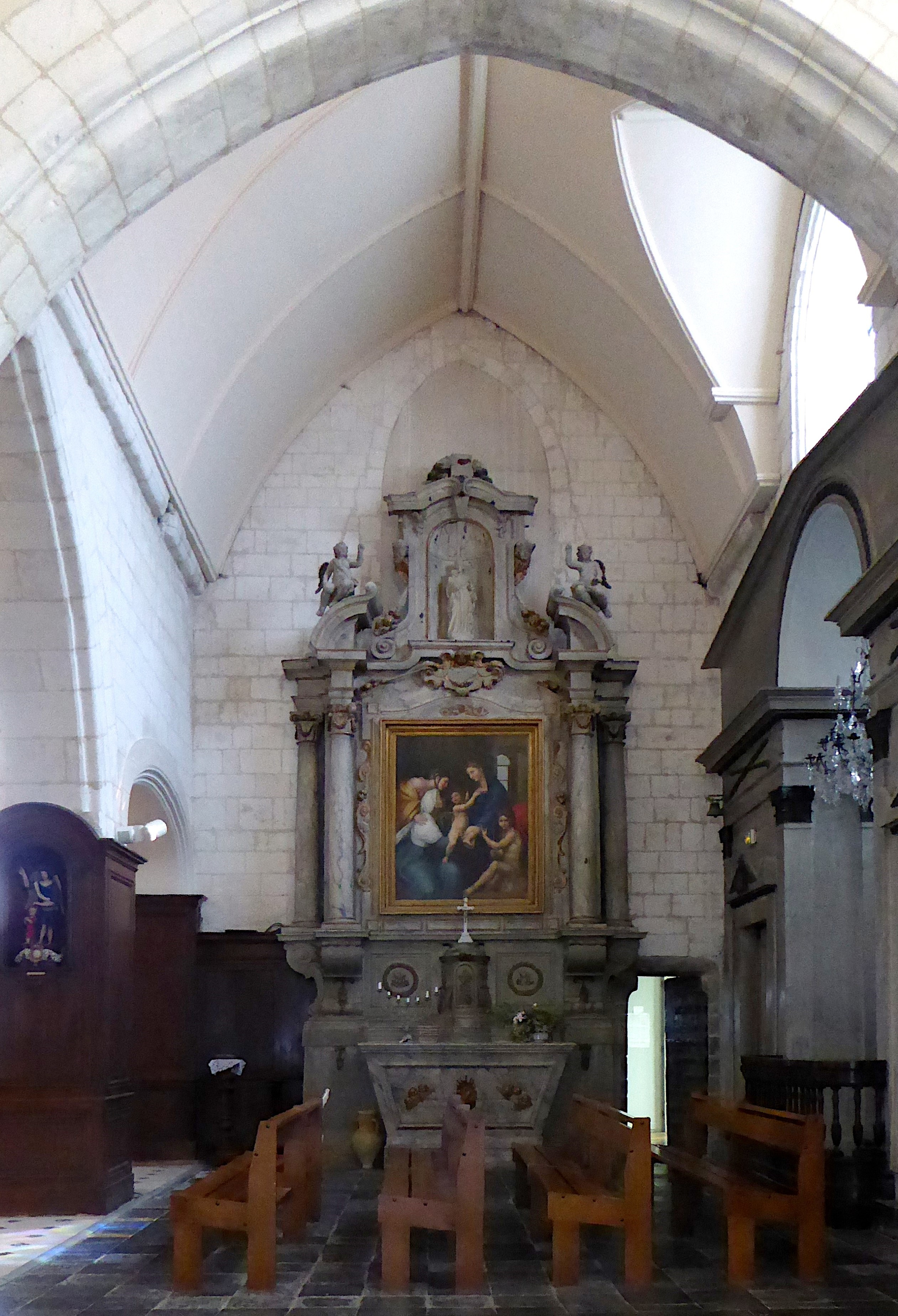
Altar of Altar of the Holy Virgin and altarpiece.
