= Hôtel de Ville, Villeneuve-d'Ascq =

Town hall in Villeneuve-d'Ascq, France

Hôtel de Ville
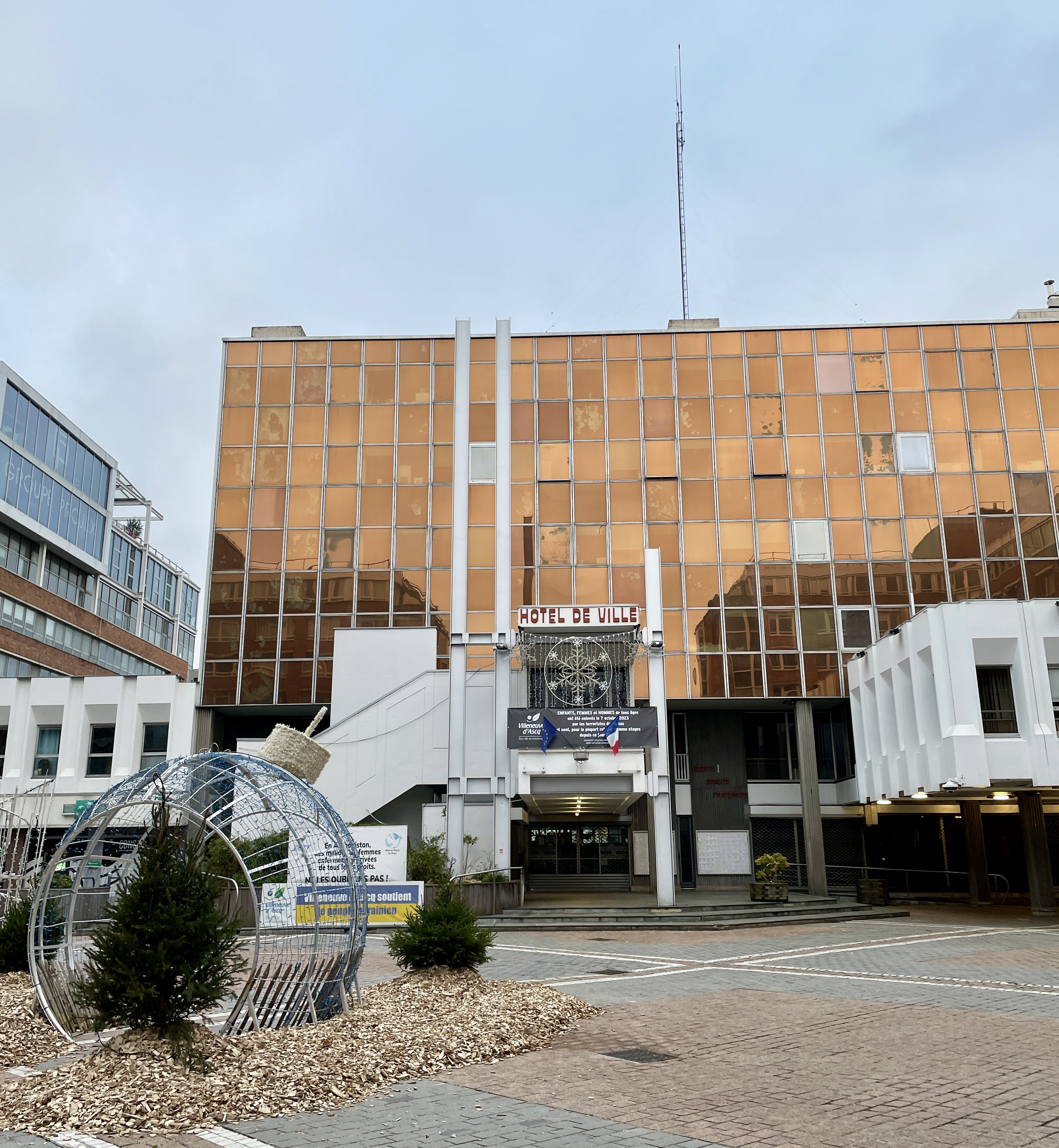
- The main frontage of the Hôtel de Ville in December 2023
- Interactive map of the Hôtel de Ville area

General information
- Type: City hall
- Architectural style: Modern style
- Location: Villeneuve-d'Ascq, France
- Coordinates: 50.6195°N 3.1318°E
- Completed: 1977

Design and construction
- Architect: Pierre-François Delannoy

The Hôtel de Ville (French pronunciation: [otɛl də vil], City Hall) is a municipal building in Villeneuve-d'Ascq, Nord in northern France, standing on Place Salvador-Allende.

== History ==
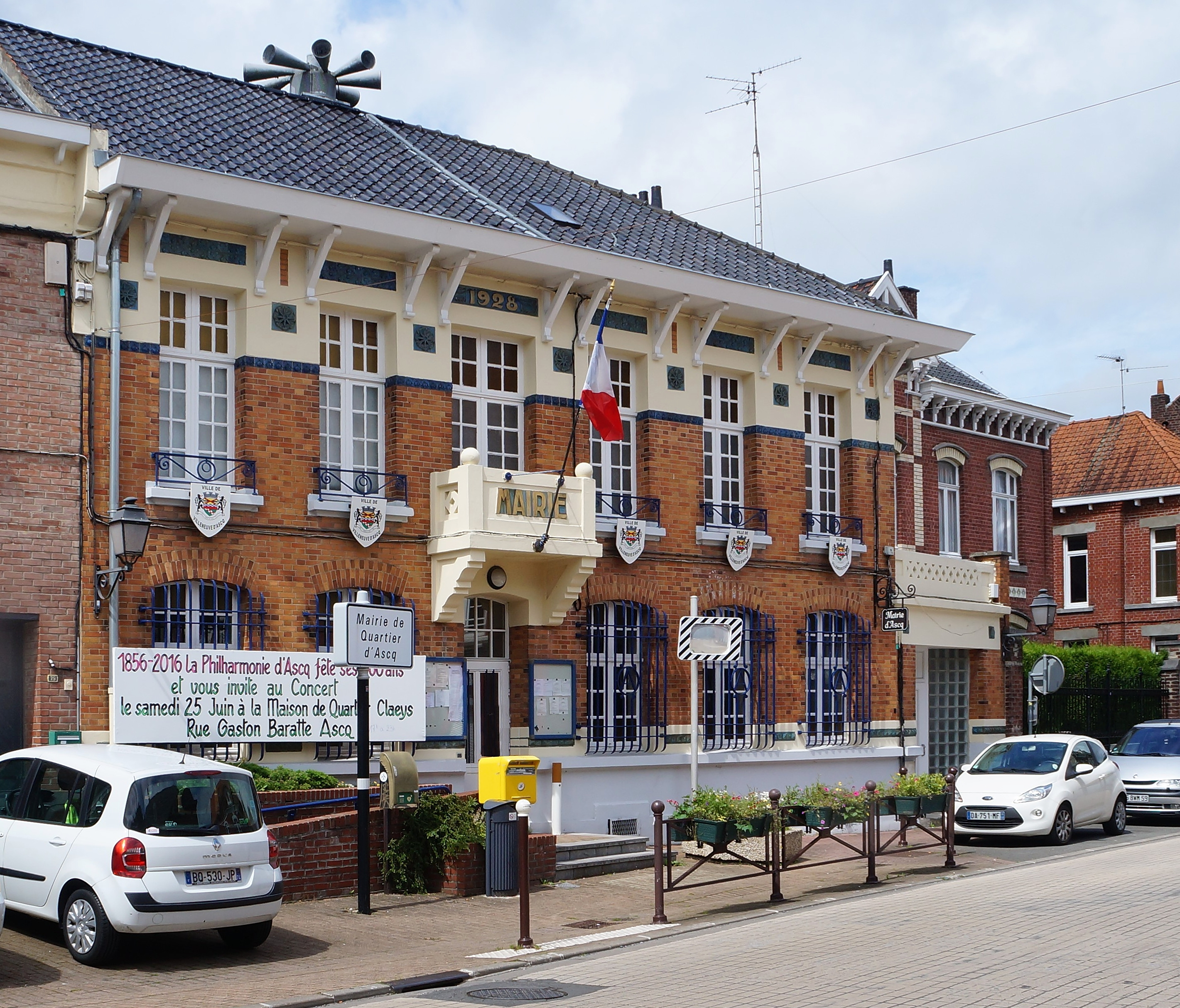
The town hall of 1928

Following the French Revolution, the new town council in Ascq established an office in a room attached to a music hall, operated by David Dupire-Lemaire. The council then relocated to a building on what is now Rue Gaston Barrette, where they rented a room from a brewer, Charles Darras, in late 1888.

In 1921, the council decided to acquire the building from Darras, so that they could demolish it and then erect a new town hall on the same site. The intention was "pour donner un caractère urbain au village" ("to give an urban character to the village"). The new building was designed in the neoclassical style, built in red brick with stone finishes and was completed in 1928. The design involved an asymmetrical main frontage of six bays facing onto Rue Gaston Barrette. The third bay on the left featured a doorway with a segmental-shaped fanlight flanked by brackets supporting a stone balcony. There was a French door on the first floor and a date stone above it. The other bays were fenestrated by segmental headed casement windows with voussoirs on the ground floor and by square headed casement windows with window sills on the first floor. The upper part of the first floor was faced with a cement render and featured a series of wooden brackets supporting the eaves.

On 1 April 1944, during the Second World War, 86 men from the town were massacred by the 12th SS Panzer Division Hitlerjugend, part of the Waffen-SS, in a reprisal for a train derailment initiated by the French Resistance. Four days later, a large crowd gathered in front of the town hall as the cortège carrying the coffins passed by.

In the 1960s, the area was selected for development as a new town to facilitate the economic growth of Lille. The new town was created by amalgamating the former communes of Ascq, Annappes and Flers-lez-Lille. There was a debate as to whether the site for the urban centre should be near the Lac Saint-Jean, or whether it should be further south on the site of the former "catiches" (chalk quarries). In the end the council selected the latter site, which was in the former commune of Annappes.

The town hall for the new town was designed by Pierre-François Delannoy in the modern style, built in concrete and glass and was officially opened by the mayor, Jean Desmarets, on 18 March 1977. The design involved an asymmetric main frontage facing onto Place Salvador-Allende. The main frontage was faced with bronze-coloured panels. There was a recessed entrance slightly to the left of centre, flanked by steel girders supporting an external staircase, located to the left of the entrance, leading up to a balcony on the first floor. There was also a concrete structure at first floor level, located to the right of the entrance, projected out over the pavement, containing the Salle du Conseil (council chamber).
