= Stormshield =

French computer security company

- Company type: Société Anonyme
- Industry: computer security
- Founded: December 6, 1999; 26 years ago
- Headquarters: Issy-les-Moulineaux, France
- Key people: Pierre-Yves Hentzen (chairman)
- Revenue: 61,021,000 euro (2021)
- Net income: 7,070,400 euro (2021)
- Number of employees: 330 (2021)
- Parent: Airbus CyberSecurity
- Website: stormshield.com

Stormshield is a French publisher of softwares specialized in computer security, formed in 2013 from the acquisition and merger by Airbus CyberSecurity of Arkoon Network Security and NetASQ. The company, headed by Pierre-Yves Hentzen, sells firewall solutions for network protection, encryption for data security and local security for workstations. Its technologies have been approved by the ANSSI, the European Union and NATO. Stormshield, which employs around 400 people, also participates in government and academic cybersecurity training and awareness programs.

== History ==
=== NetASQ ===
NetASQ was founded in 1998 at the Haute Borne science park, in Villeneuve-d'Ascq (Nord). The company marketed the first firewall with integrated intrusion detection system.

=== Arkoon ===
Founded in Lyon in 2000, Arkoon was a company providing hardware and softwares for computer security. It was known for developing the UTM FAST360 appliance, a unified threat management solution, a firewall network more advanced than traditional firewalls. It made its IPO in 2007 on Alternext, a Euronext trading platform tailored to small and medium-sized enterprises.

In 2009, Arkoon acquired SkyRecon Systems and its product named Stormshield, a protection solution for workstations and computer servers. This acquisition followed on from the acquisition four years earlier of MSI, a company specializing in cryptography and data encryption, to provide a complete range, later called Stormshield Endpoint Security. One of the aims of this new global solution was to address data loss issues via data loss prevention systems.

=== Acquisition and merger of the two entities ===
Arkoon and Netasq were acquired in 2012 and 2013 respectively by Airbus CyberSecurity, then named Cassidian CyberSecurity and a subsidiary of aircraft manufacturer EADS, which later became Airbus. The two companies merged in 2014 to create Stormshield, which took the name of Arkoon's solution and went on to become Europe's leading firewalls. In that year, the company developed new product ranges focused on workstation and data security protection, in addition to its historic business of network protection.

Subsequently, Stormshield signed partnerships to develop products integrating hardware and software security. This was the case, for example, with Gemalto, the world's leading producer of SIM cards, which later became Thales Digital Identity and Security. In 2016, the two companies announced a technology that secures connections so that all mobile terminals in a company can easily exchange data. Stormshield also launched the first industrial firewall in partnership with Schneider Electric, a societas Europaea specializing in electrical energy and energy efficiency.

Today, Stormshield has around 400 employees. While its historical market is government organizations and critical operators, it has gradually opened up to multinational corporations and small and medium-sized companies.

== Products ==
Stormshield's solutions focus on anticipating cybercrime threats and adapting to rapid technical developments in this field, due in particular to the structuring of hackers networks into organized crime with substantial material and financial resources and sometimes even state support. This is one of the reasons why Stormshield keeps all product development in Europe.

Stormshield operates three software product ranges: Stormshield Network Security, dedicated to network protection, Stormshield Endpoint Security for the protection of workstations and Stormshield Data Security for data protection. These technologies have received security approvals issued by the Agence nationale de la sécurité des systèmes d'information (ANSSI). They have also received approvals from the European Union and NATO.

== CSR activities ==
=== Participation in government programs ===
Stormshield is a member of the ACYMA (French: Action contre la cybermalveillance or Action against online piracy), since 2017. An initiative led by Agence nationale de la sécurité des systèmes d'information (ANSSI), this is a scheme to assist victims of online piracy. Stormshield is particularly involved in raising employee awareness within companies.

=== Higher education partnerships ===
Stormshield has set up a training academy through which it contributes to the cybersecurity programs of around 250 schools and universities in France and abroad, providing teaching resources and certifications for teachers. It has forged partnerships with public engineering schools such as the École polytechnique universitaire de Montpellier or with private IT schools Wide Code School and Mewo or Hexagone school.

This initiative enables the company to train teachers, deliver certification courses to students and meet the growing need for specialized IT security skills. Some of Stormshield's certifications benefit from the SecNumedu label, which meets the criteria of the ANSSI.
