= Isam Shahrour =

Isam Shahrour (born 22 April 1956) is a Palestinian academic whose work focused on sustainable systems, including urban and civil engineering infrastructure and systems and services. He is emeritus Professor in Civil and Smart Systems at Lille University in France.

He served as vice president for Research and Innovation at Lille 1 University. He founded and chaired the Civil and Geo-environmental Research Laboratory in the North of France.

== Early life and education ==
Shahrour was born in Tulkarm, Palestine on 22 April 1956. He studied civil engineering at the École Nationale des Ponts et Chaussées (Ponts et Chaussées) in Paris, earning a master's degree in 1982, followed by a Master's in Applied Mechanics from the University of Paris VI. He completed his Ph.D. in Civil Engineering at Ponts et Chaussées in 1984 and obtained his Habilitation à diriger des recherches (HdR) from Lille University in 1988.

== Academic career ==
Shahrour joined the University of Lille in 1984 as an assistant professor, then served as a research engineer at the French Institute of Petroleum in 1988. He later became a professor at the École Centrale de Lille from 1989 to 1997 and returned to the University of Lille in 1997, where he remained until becoming emeritus Professor in 2023.

From 2007 to 2012, he served as vice-president for Research and Innovation at Lille 1 University.

Shahrour founded and chaired the Civil and Geo-Environmental Engineering Research Laboratory (LGCgE) for a decade.

== Research and works ==
Shahrour's research spans civil engineering, geotechnics, environmental engineering, sustainable development, and smart urban systems. His early scholarly work centered on numerical and physical modelling in geotechnical engineering, soil–structure interaction, underground infrastructure safety, and environmental geomechanics.

From the 2000s onward, he became a contributor to the development of smart and sustainable city research, implementing the integration of information technologies, sensor networks, and digital platforms into urban infrastructure management. His work includes the early development of smart water networks and leakage detection systems, the modelling and optimization of urban energy and environmental performance, the creation of frameworks for data-driven urban governance, resilience planning for municipal infrastructure networks, and sustainability strategies for natural resource management.

Since 2011, he has coordinated SunRise, a laboratory for smart urban systems at the University of Lille. The project integrates smart water networks, energy systems, mobility solutions, and environmental monitoring, in partnership with local governments, infrastructure providers, and technology companies.

Shahrour coordinated the French partners in the European SmartWater4Europe, which aimed to demonstrate large-scale smart water technologies for quality monitoring, leak management, and system optimization.

He served as President of Lille Métropole Technopole (TLM), where he oversaw technology parks including Euratechnologies, Haute-Borne, and La Plaine Images.

He also served as President of the Centre for Innovation in Contactless Technology (CITC).
