= Lys-lez-Lannoy =

- Commune
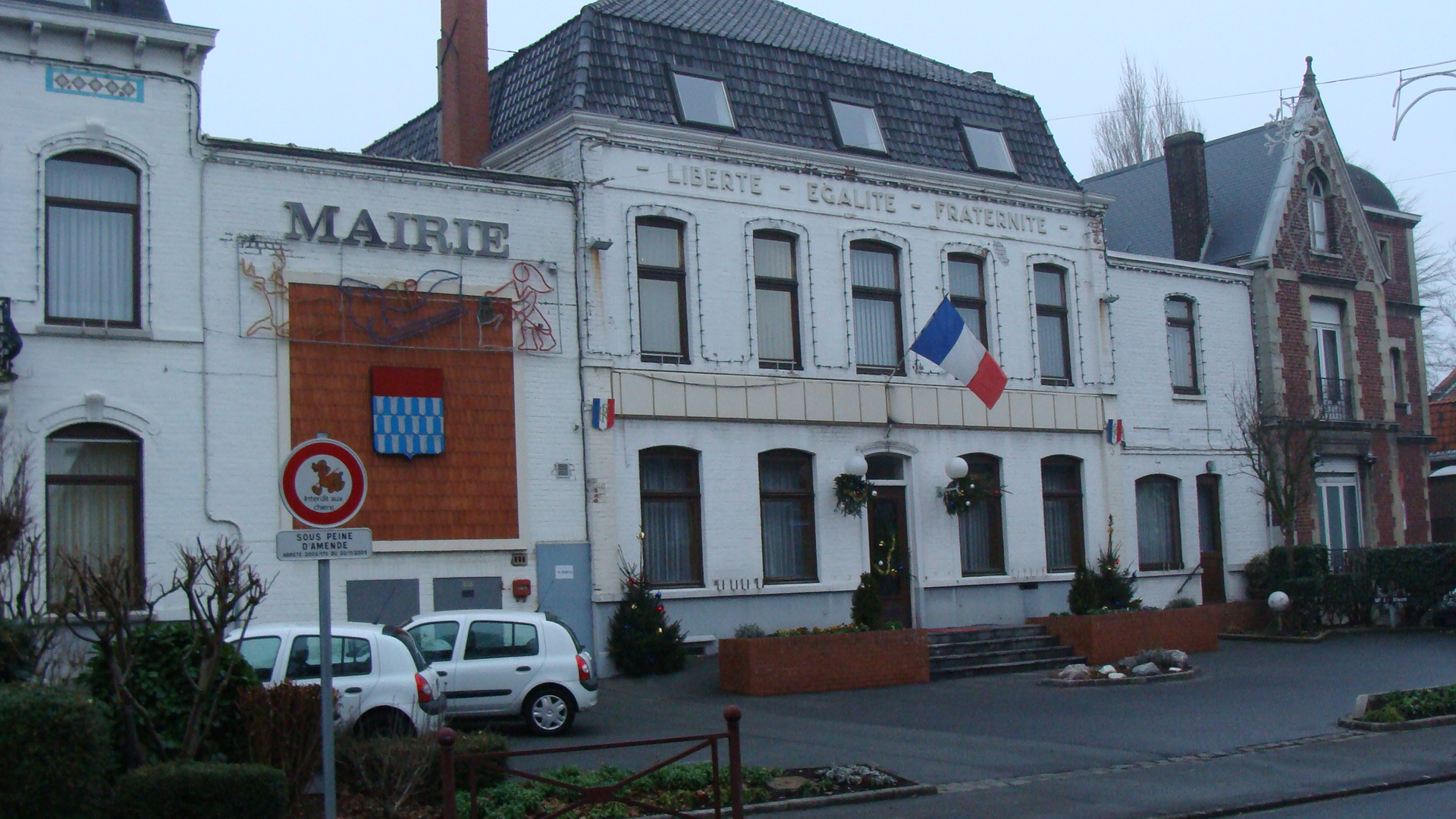
- The town hall in Lys-lez-Lannoy

- Coat of arms
- Location of Lys-lez-Lannoy
- Location within France Location within Hauts-de-France
- Coordinates: 50°40′20″N 3°12′55″E
- Country: France
- Region: Hauts-de-France
- Department: Nord
- Arrondissement: Lille
- Canton: Croix
- Intercommunality: Métropole Européenne de Lille

Government
  - Mayor (2020–2026): Nono Hennache
- Area^{1}: 3.26 km^{2} (1.26 sq mi)
- Elevation: 33 m (108 ft)
- Highest elevation: 39 m (128 ft)
- Lowest elevation: 20 m (66 ft)
- Population (2023): 14,050
  - Density: 4,310/km^{2} (11,200/sq mi)
- Time zone: UTC+01:00 (CET)
  - Summer (DST): UTC+02:00 (CEST)
- INSEE/Postal code: 59367 /59390
- ^{1} French Land Register data, which excludes lakes, ponds, glaciers > 1 km^{2} (0.386 sq mi or 247 acres) and river estuaries.

Lys-lez-Lannoy (French pronunciation: [lis le lanwa], literally Lys near Lannoy; West Flemish: Lis by Lannoy) is a commune in the Nord department in northern France. It is part of the Métropole Européenne de Lille.

== Population ==
Historical population
Year	Pop.	±% p.a.
1968	10,403	—
1975	10,984	+0.78%
1982	11,077	+0.12%
1990	12,300	+1.32%
1999	13,018	+0.63%
2007	12,783	−0.23%
2012	13,317	+0.82%
2017	13,422	+0.16%
2023	14,050	+0.77%
Source: INSEE

== Heraldry ==
Arms of Lys-lez-Lannoy	The arms of Lys-lez-Lannoy are blazoned : Vair, a chief gules.

== See also ==
- Communes of the Nord department
