= Annappes =

Village in France

Coordinates: 50°37′35″N 3°9′2″E

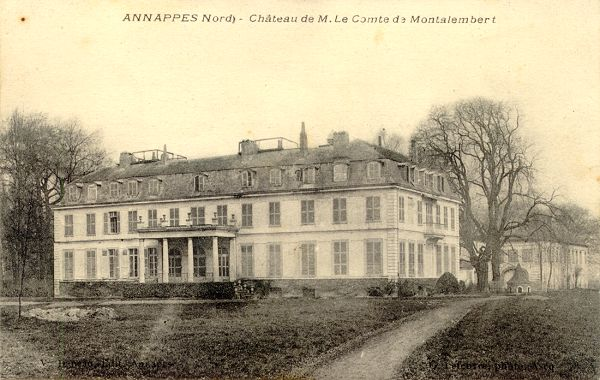
Château de Montalembert ca 1900

Annappes (French pronunciation: [anap]) is a village and former commune of the Nord Department of France, on the river Marque. In 1970, it was merged with the communes of Ascq and Flers-lez-Lille to form the new commune of Villeneuve d'Ascq. It is still a district of the commune today.

== Etymology of the name ==
The origin of the name Annappes is very turbid. Theodore Leuridan fr:Théodore Leuridan, in a historical note on Annappes, considers several solutions

- asnapis formed of the radical goth ap, ahva = water (aqua in Latin)
- word meaning into Celtic "with a curve of rivière"
- contraction of "AD Menapios": Annappes was located at the end of the territory of Nerviens towards the country of Ménapiens. Dauzat and Rostaing, in the Etymological dictionary of the place names in France, think that the name comes from Germanic the hanap, hemp.

== History ==
=== Origins ===
In 1980, a fragment of polished flint axe was found in the park of the current Saint-Adrien School. It is estimated to date from approximately 2000 BC. Other axes of this kind were discovered in the area of Lille, in particular in the alluvia of Deûle. The historians allot them to populations using cut stone tools, but already devoted to cattle breeding and agriculture. However, it is no proof that man was sedentary there; indeed archaeologists have now found traces of human occupation at the end of the independent Gallic era, in particular of sling stones, on the level of the Center Marc-Sautelet. However, it is probable, that this place was not a place of residence, but simply one of the folds in the forest (as described by Julius Caesar), where the Gallic people of the area took refuge from the Roman legions.

=== The royal field of Asnapio ===
==== Age of Charlemagne ====
Annappes and its surroundings are with the Middle Ages the site of a royal field, as indicated on a text from the reign of Charlemagne. He must certainly have passed by the field of Asnapio to go to inaugurate the battle of Saint-Riquier in the year 800. At the time of the arrival of Charlemagne for the inauguration of the battle of Saint-Riquier in 800, his royal envoys drew up an inventory at Annappes. The description was so meticulous, that it was recopied as an example, in a handbook of management of the imperial farms, the Capitulary of Villis. Asnapio (its name at the time) was a very rich Carolingian field. About a hundred people lived there in the farm, surrounded by orchards. The peasants cultivated cereals on Mélantois. The outputs were raised enough, and five mills and four breweries, which manufactured the barley beer of the tenants, were installed close to the Mark river. The field had been built close to the marshes, and Asnapio was also a stud farm, which supplied the imperial cavalry. Here the composition of its livestock in 799:

- 51 mares, 3 standards, 10 foals, 2 asses,
- 16 oxen, 50 cows having calved, 20 heifers, 3 bulls, 38 calves,
- 260 pigs, 100 piglets, 5 boars,
- 150 ewe, 120 sheep, 200 lambs,
- 30 goats, 3 goats, 30 kids; 30 geese, 80 chickens, 22 peacocks.

In 836, emperor Louis the Pious gave the royal field to his daughter Gisele, wife of Eberhard of Friuli. This noble couple founded the abbey of Cysoing. The first marquis Berenger, one of their sons, inherited Annappes; he was the King of Lombards thereafter, and then Emperor of the Romans.

==== Viking Age ====
The royal field described at the time of Charlemagne was much the same at time of the invasion of the continent by the Vikings. In 881, the Norman plunder of their camp of Courtrai, its field; Annappes, and no text mentions it any more.

=== Comté of Flanders ===
During the 10th century, the count de Flander, installed with Lille, and monopolized the territory of Annappes. All the villagers from then on were subject to the authority of Counts of Comtal. The count appointed a mayor, an officer comtal, to manage the fields, Annappes. In 1066, Baudouin V of Flanders gives, by the charter of equipment Saint-Pierre of Lille, two-thirds of the incomes of the church of Annappes. However, it is not known, if there is a bond between this church and the current church Saint-Sebastien of Annappes. At that time, Annappes maintains the close relationships with its neighbors, the villages of Ascq and of Flers-lez-Lille. The count Baudouin IX demolished part of this field of the town hall of Annappes, to build a stronghold to Gilbert de Bourghelles. About 1200 he creates its manor, the strong house of Quiquempois. Gilbert, married with the widow of the lord of the manor of Lille, provides this military function at the beginning of the 13th century. At the time of the departure of the count for the crusades, Gilbert de Bourghelles, lord of Quiquempois is one of the four baillif-procurateurs of the county of Flanders. After the disappearance of Baudouin IX, who become emperor of Constantinople, in 1205, the lord of Quiquempois plays an eminent role, near the heiresses of the county. In 1214, it is he, who advises the new count de Flanders, Ferrand of Portugal. The alliance with Jean sans Terre, and Otto IV, Holy Roman Emperor, will be fatal for him, at the time of Battle of Bouvines, on 27 July 1214.

The count equips the religious establishments with some of his grounds. For example, the hospital Saint-Saver, which has a large farm with corn with Annappes in the 13th century. It is at that time that Preudhomme, middle-class inhabitant of Lille, recovers the town hall comtale of Annappes, and that the échevinage (municipal council) is given the responsibility to define payments common to the three villages of Annappes, Ascq, and Flers-lez-Lille. Although the territory is rich, the country population is very precarious, and must undergo several famines, from the 14th to the 15th centuries. In particular there was famine during the year 1316, following bad harvests the year before. Another misfortune, that cuts down on the area, is the war of 1297 and 1304, when French troops of Philip IV of France and those of Flemings devastate the cultures and burn the village. In 1340, at the beginning of the Hundred Years' War, the village is militarily occupied. In 1349, it is the black death, which cuts down on the area, and the population of Annappes decreases considerably. During the 14th century, the economy of the village is growing gently, in spite of the periodic plagues, bad harvests, and the almost constant presence of soldiers. After being burned by the troops of Louis XI, the church is rebuilt. The oldest parts of the church of Annappes go back to that time.

=== The Burgundians ===
In 1369, the county of Flanders was attached to Duchy of Burgundy after the marriage of Margaret III, Countess of Flanders, and Philip the Bold, duke of Burgundy. The population started to grow again very quickly, even if Annappes remains smaller than Ascq, and Flers-lez-Lille. In 1449, tax investigations counted 78 inhabitants within Annappes. After the confrontations between Charles the Bold of Burgundy and Louis XI of France in 1498, the population was 410 inhabitants. In 1505, 500 people lived in the village, and the livestock was 34 horses, 20 foals, 284 cows, 408 sheep. In 1477, when the last duke of Burgundy, Charles the Bold died, the title passed to Mary of Burgundy wife of Habsburg Maximilian I, Holy Roman Emperor, who then took the title of count of Flanders. At the end of the reign of his successor, the Germanic Roman Emperor Charles V, Spanish Flanders fell to his oldest son. Annappes thus passes under the supervision of Philip II, king of Spain and remained under Spanish authority until the reign of Philip IV of Spain. In 1605 The archdukes create the county of Annapes for don Juan de Roblès.

=== Starting in France ===
In 1667, Louis XIV reached Lille and took the city. In 1668, Annappes then became a French village by the treaty of Aachen. The village was constantly beset by the effects of the war: housing the troops, requisition of all kinds, devastation, and exaction of the soldiers. From 1708 until 1713, the area was occupied by the Britannico-Dutchmen of John Churchill, 1st Duke of Marlborough, who returned in 1744. In 1737, the priest of Annappes supported a lengthy lawsuit to obtain the catch of load of a vicar by the Saint-Pierre chapter. Thanks to him, it is known that the cantons of Marchenelles, Hempempont, and the Collection were called small Hollande because the inhabitants very seldom attended church. The same year, one index of Annappes, shows 180 households and 1021 inhabitants.

In 1774, the king allowed the division of the marshes between the three villages and their neighbours, which were drained in 1781. The elimination of illiteracy progressed: between 1737 and 1789, 50% of the men and 32% of the women could sign their marriage certificate in Annappes. Cultural life also developed, with ducasse (a traditional village festival), twice a year in the village. People also celebrated Midsummer's Day, Saint Martin's day and Saint-Éloi. In Annappes, as in Flers-lez-Lille, shooting contests were organized.

=== Révolution and Napoleonic Wars ===
As in Lille, there is not a popular revolution by the peasants in 1789. The peasants are occupied with the distribution of their communal marsh. In January 1790, Jean-Baptiste Fancy is elected mayor of Annappes. A. Boussemart will succeed him. In April 1792, at the time of the declaration of war against Austria, the regiments gather between Lille and Baisieux, to be directed towards the enemy. But with the approach of the enemy near Baisieux, as of the first cannonades, they beat a retreat towards Lille, where the crowd killed the general Théobald Dillon, believing him to be guilty of collusion with the Austrians.

Austrians directed by Prince Albert of Saxony, Duke of Teschen occupy the area after having taken Roubaix, Tourcoing and Lannoy. However, they raise the Siege of Lille on 8 October, vis-a-vis the impossibility of seizing the city. The Mark River separated the republican troops stationed in Flers, Annappes and Ascq, and the Austrians at the end of 1792 until the beginning of 1794. The coalition formed against France invaded the village in 1794, but the victory in the Battle of Tourcoing, on 18 May 1794, push back the enemy. Under the Reign of Terror, the goods of the emigrants are confiscated. In the same way, silverware and objects of worship of Saint-Sebastien church are inventoried, sent to Lille and are recovered by the State. The church will even be sold on 29 September 1798 with the bidding at the same time as those of Ascq and of Flers-lez-Lille, but will not be demolished. After a Legal settlement, it will be taken again by the monks. From 1800, the mayors are named by prefect. The first will be P.J. Mahieu for Annappes.

=== Nineteenth century ===
Annappes remained primarily artisanal and agricultural during the 19th century . Great landowners remained with the authority of the borough, like the baron of Worsen Romain Joseph baron de Brigode - deputy of Northern (department) during 19 years between 1805 and 1837 and mayor of the commune from 1814 until 1848, and his friends De Clercy, and the Count de Montalembert, who dominated the village. Still at that time, the villages suffer from the epidemics and difficult work conditions (Sunday rest not respected, enforced child labor). Annappes remained very rural, and was slow to accept progress. The motorists of Annappes are seen being advised in 1903 to yield to horses.

In 1875, Louis Spriet, a farmer from Annappes, decided to develop the family business and built in 1876 an agricultural distilling of grains. Its successor, another farmer (of Bouvines), who became owner of the building in 1898, transformed the activity, and built a brewery that he baptizes with first name of his wife Holy-Marie brewery. The farm continued to function, while the brewery became a very flourishing company. In 1971, with the construction of the new city, expropriation was decided upon, and the brewery shut down in 1973.

=== Twentieth century ===
In October 1914, the Germans occupied the area, up to the liberation by British in October 1918. With the population increase due, in part, to the influx of townsmen from the periphery of Lille, the population of the village increased considerably. In 1939, Annappes counted approximately 4000 inhabitants. In the first half of the 20th century, Annappes was made up of 75% workmen, and guarded the village character with few liberal professions or industrial middle-class.

During World War, Annappes was controlled by the German command in Brussels, and was not part of Vichy France. The German occupation lasted from May 1940 until September 1944, and the zone was once again liberated by the British.

In 1958 the Association of the paralysed fr:Association des Paralysés de France the created the Marc-Sautelet Center of functional rehabilitation, which continued to develop. From 1964 until 1967, a scientific university campus was created on grounds mainly at the south of the commune of Annappes. The Faculty of Science of Lille, today Lille University of Science and Technology is there. In 1967, it Urban Community of Lille Métropole was created and gathers 89 communes, including Annappes, Ascq and Flers. On 4 February 1970, at the time of a press conference, the town halls of Annappes, of Ascq and of Flers announce that their communes will amalgamate. On 25 February, Annappes no longer exists as a commune, and became a simple district of the new city of Villeneuve d'Ascq. In 1974, Annappes numbered 13,800 inhabitants.

== Heraldry ==
Arms of Annappes	The arms of Annappes are blazoned : Vert, a bend chequy argent and gules of 2 traits.

== Bibliography ==
- Annappes (historical Note), Monographs of the cities and villages of France of Micberth by Theodore Leuridan, 1989, réimp. edict. 1881,14 X 20, Br., 112 p. ISBN 2-87760-180-3
