= Léon Debouverie =

French politician

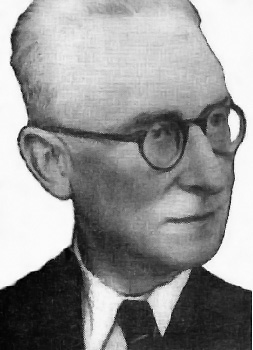
- Born: 3 June 1889; Lannoy, Nord, France
- Died: 10 March 1950 (aged 60); Amiens, Somme France
- Occupation: Politician
- Political party: Popular Republican Movement

Léon Debouverie (3 June 1889 - 10 March 1950) was a French politician. He was appointed as the mayor of Amiens by the Vichy government on 17 June 1940, but he was arrested by the Germans in June 1941 and given an eleven-month prison sentence. He remained on house arrest until the end of the war. He served as a member of the National Assembly from 1945 to 1946, representing Somme.
