= Hem, Nord =

Hem
- Commune
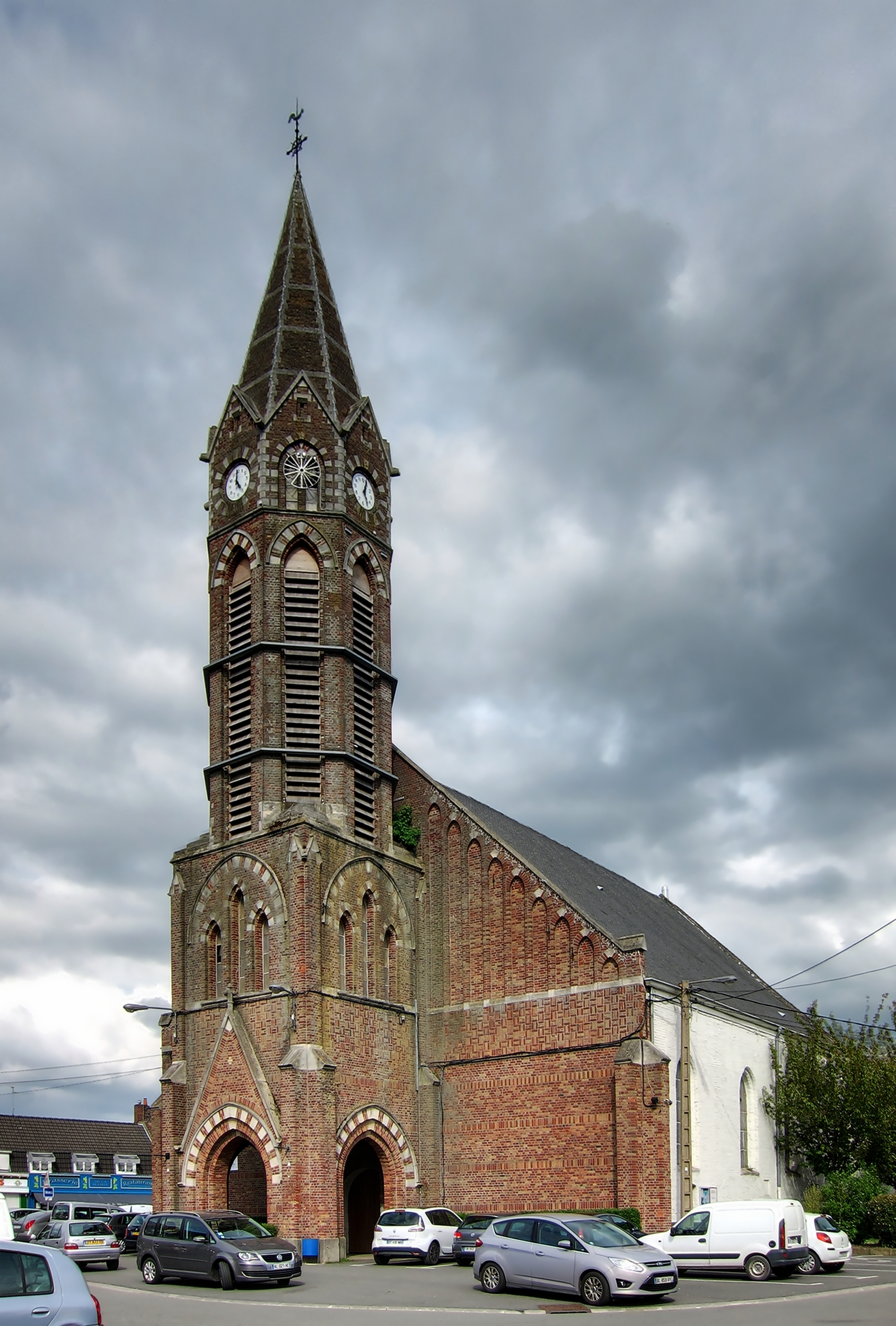
- The church in Hem

- Coat of arms
- Location of Hem
- Location within France Location within Hauts-de-France
- Coordinates: 50°39′21″N 3°11′19″E
- Country: France
- Region: Hauts-de-France
- Department: Nord
- Arrondissement: Lille
- Canton: Croix
- Intercommunality: Métropole Européenne de Lille

Government
  - Mayor (2020–2026): Val Queste
- Area^{1}: 9.65 km^{2} (3.73 sq mi)
- Elevation: 45 m (148 ft)
- Population (2023): 18,582
  - Density: 1,930/km^{2} (4,990/sq mi)
- Time zone: UTC+01:00 (CET)
  - Summer (DST): UTC+02:00 (CEST)
- INSEE/Postal code: 59299 /59510
- ^{1} French Land Register data, which excludes lakes, ponds, glaciers > 1 km^{2} (0.386 sq mi or 247 acres) and river estuaries.

Hem (French pronunciation: [ɛm]; Dutch: Ham) is a commune in the Nord department in northern France.

It is located near the city of Roubaix.

== History ==
Hem is one of the oldest communes in the North of France. Originally known as ‘Ham’, it became ‘Hem’ during the 14th century. The name means ‘the dwelling-place’ and suggests a large number of households of the size of a hamlet.

A territory of around 9.65 km^{2} (3.73 sq mi), Hem at the beginning of the 19th century numbered just 4 876 inhabitants. It was at first essentially an agricultural centre with the fine plains of Hauts-Champs, Longchamp, Beaumont and Le Civron, but would reach the height of its industrial prosperity in 1900 although there would still be 41 farmers.

After the Second World War the population of Hem began to grow rapidly. In the space of twenty years, Hem's population quadrupled. The town's former centre found itself increasingly pushed towards the town limits; the new housing was largely concentrated around the north of the town and would accommodate almost 50 per cent of the population. This housing would count for 72 per cent of the total housing of Hem but only 15 per cent of the total area of the town.

Unfortunately, the employment offered by the various firms and retail outlets of the town would not keep pace with the town's growth. In 1975, only 2 200 jobs were on offer to a potential workforce of 7 890 people (almost half of whom were manual workers). From the mid-1970s, with deindustrialisation, the town's population began experiencing slow but regular decline.

Since the 1990s, the municipal authority of Hem has prioritized the town's economic prosperity; as a result, around 15 new firms have set up in the town.

== Population ==
Historical population
Year	Pop.	±% p.a.
1968	16,742	—
1975	23,183	+4.76%
1982	21,933	−0.79%
1990	20,200	−1.02%
1999	19,675	−0.29%
2007	18,093	−1.04%
2012	18,374	+0.31%
2017	18,617	+0.26%
2023	18,582	−0.03%
Source: INSEE

== Heraldry ==
Arms of Hem	The arms of Hem are blazoned : Argent, a chief gules. (Bourghelles and Hem use the same arms.)

== Monuments ==
The Chapelle Sainte Thérèse (Saint Theresa's Chapel) was consecrated in 1958 by Cardinal Achille Liénart, Bishop of Lille. It was designed by the Swiss architect Hermann Baur. Its shape is reminiscent of a barn. It contains numerous works of modern art, including two walls of stained glass produced by Alfred Manessier. A scene from the French film The Dreamlife of Angels was shot within the Chapel.

== People ==
- Daouda Sow (silver medallist in lightweight boxing at the 2008 Olympics).
- Alain Bondue (French Olympic racing cyclist).
- Michael Fortunati, pop singer, born in Italy but raised in Hem.
- Saida Jawad, French actress.

== Twin towns ==
Hem is twinned with the following towns:

- Mossley, Greater Manchester, United Kingdom
- Aljustrel, Alentejo Portugal
- Wiehl, North Rhine-Westphalia, Germany

== See also ==
- Communes of the Nord department
