= Cofidis =

French financial services company

- Company type: Subsidiary
- Industry: Financial services
- Founded: 1982
- Founder: 3 Suisses
- Headquarters: Villeneuve-d'Ascq, France
- Area served: France, Belgium, Spain, Portugal, Italy, Poland, Hungary, Czech Republic, Slovakia
- Products: Consumer credit, Personal loans, Revolving credit, Insurance
- Revenue: €19.7 billion (2023)
- Number of employees: 5,894 (2023)
- Parent: Crédit Mutuel
- Website: cofidis-group.com

Cofidis (from the French: Compagnie financière de distribution) is a French multinational consumer credit company owned by Crédit Mutuel. It was founded in 1982 by 3 Suisses, a company jointly owned by the Otto and Mulliez families, to provide financing for mail-order purchases. Headquartered in Villeneuve-d'Ascq, France, Cofidis specializes in providing consumer loans and credit solutions primarily through remote channels such as telephone and online platforms. Over the years, the company has expanded internationally, establishing operations in several European countries.

== History ==
In the mid-1980s, Cofidis opened its first international branch in Belgium and subsequently expanded to Spain, Italy, Portugal, the Czech Republic, Hungary, Slovakia, Poland, Greece and Romania. The company operates under four brands: Cofidis, Monabanq, Creatis, and SynerGIE, offering consumer loans, insurance, credit consolidation, payment solutions, and digital banking services.

In 2003, Cofidis and Crédit Mutuel Nord Europe launched the joint venture Créfidis. In 2004, Cofidis acquired a majority stake in C2C, the financial subsidiary of Camif. Cofidis ceased its operations in Greece by 2006.

In 2008–2009, Crédit Mutuel Alliance Fédérale (through Banque Fédérative du Crédit Mutuel) became the majority shareholder in Cofidis. By 2020, it held 80% of the group. In 2024, Crédit Mutuel acquired the remaining 20% of Cofidis shares previously held by the Otto Group and the Mulliez family, thereby becoming the sole owner of Cofidis and its sister companies Monabanq and Creatis.

In 2010, Cofidis also withdrew from Romania due to ongoing financial difficulties and limited prospects for profitability.

In 2023, Cofidis France served about 10 million clients and collaborated with over 1,000 retail partners.

In Hungary, Cofidis acquired Magyar Cetelem Bank in 2023 from BNP Paribas Personal Finance, boosting its presence in Hungary.

In 2023, Cofidis developed a methodology to calculate its carbon footprint, with intentions to apply it across its European operations by 2024. The company has also offered credit products aimed at social objectives, including zero-interest loans for bicycle purchases and loans designed for people with disabilities.

== Sponsorships ==
The company is the owner and main sponsor of the professional cycling team Cofidis, which competes annually in the Tour de France. The company also sponsored the Belgian Cup of football, known as the “Cofidis Cup”, from 2009 until 2015.

In 2020, Cofidis was noted for using prominent product placement in the Franco-Belgian television series Astrid et Raphaëlle.
