= Castelmoron-d'Albret =

- Commune
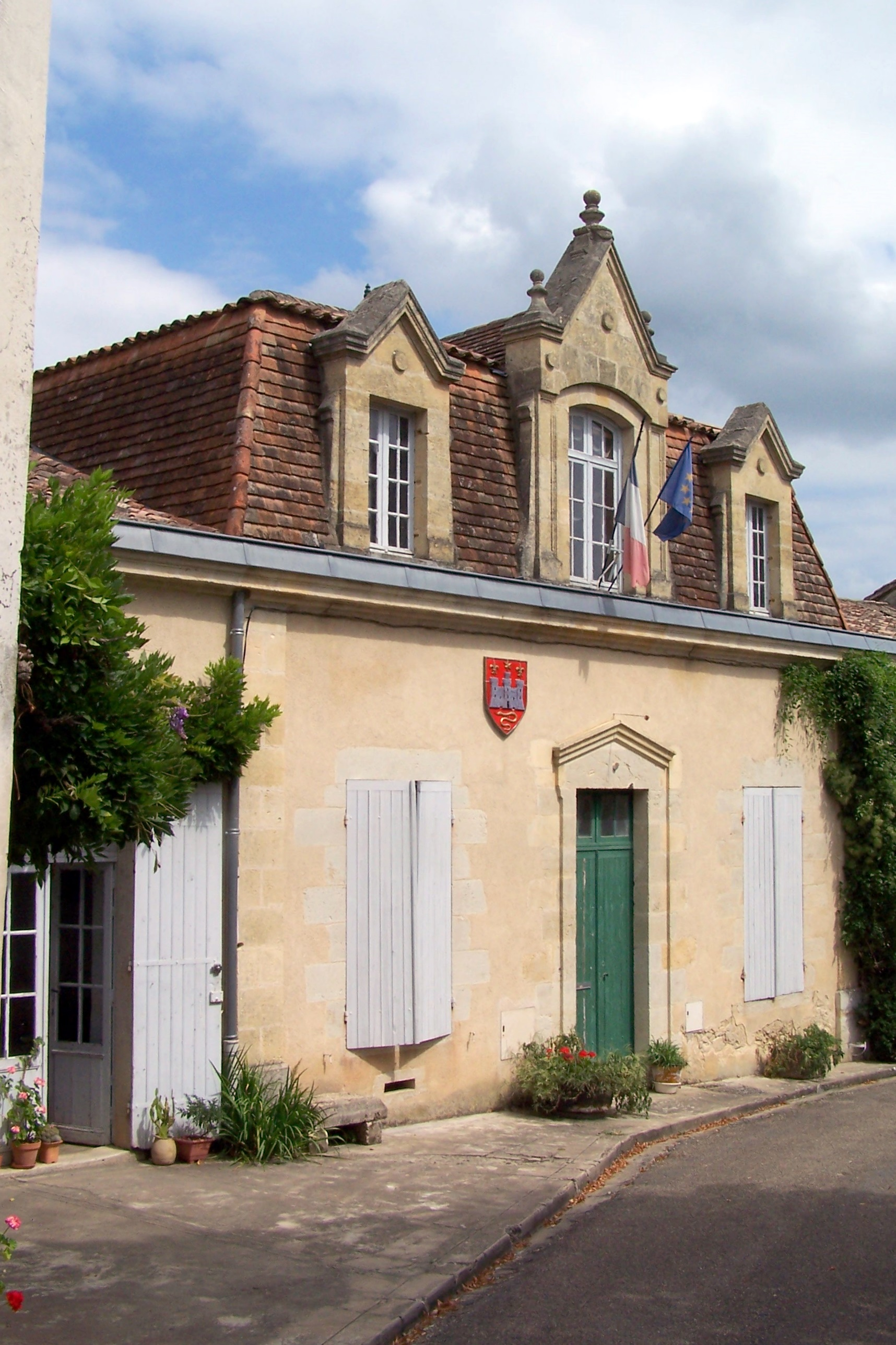
- The town hall in Castelmoron-d'Albret

- Coat of arms
- Location of Castelmoron-d'Albret
- Location within France Location within Nouvelle-Aquitaine
- Coordinates: 44°40′50″N 0°00′38″W
- Country: France
- Region: Nouvelle-Aquitaine
- Department: Gironde
- Arrondissement: Langon
- Canton: Le Réolais et Les Bastides

Government
  - Mayor (2020–2026): André Greze
- Area^{1}: 0.0354 km^{2} (0.0137 sq mi)
- Elevation: 80 m (260 ft)
- Highest elevation: 61 m (200 ft)
- Lowest elevation: 37 m (121 ft)
- Population (2023): 50
  - Density: 1,400/km^{2} (3,700/sq mi)
- Time zone: UTC+01:00 (CET)
  - Summer (DST): UTC+02:00 (CEST)
- INSEE/Postal code: 33103 /33540
- ^{1} French Land Register data, which excludes lakes, ponds, glaciers > 1 km^{2} (0.386 sq mi or 247 acres) and river estuaries.

Castelmoron-d'Albret (French pronunciation: [kastɛlmɔʁɔ̃ dalbʁɛ]; Occitan: Castèlmauron d'Albret) is a commune in the Gironde department in Nouvelle-Aquitaine in south-western France.

It is notable for being the smallest commune in France by size, with an area of just 3.54 hectares (8.75 acres), roughly the size of the Place Charles de Gaulle in Paris. By comparison, the largest commune in metropolitan France is Arles, with an area of 759 km^{2} (293 sq mi). It is the smallest commune in France, and is smaller than the nations of Monaco and Vatican City.

== Population ==
Historical population
Year	Pop.	±% p.a.
1968	82	—
1975	79	−0.53%
1982	62	−3.40%
1990	64	+0.40%
1999	62	−0.35%
2007	56	−1.26%
2012	53	−1.10%
2017	53	+0.00%
2023	50	−0.97%
Source: INSEE

== See also ==
- Communes of the Gironde department
