= Lannoy, Nord =

Lannoy
- Commune
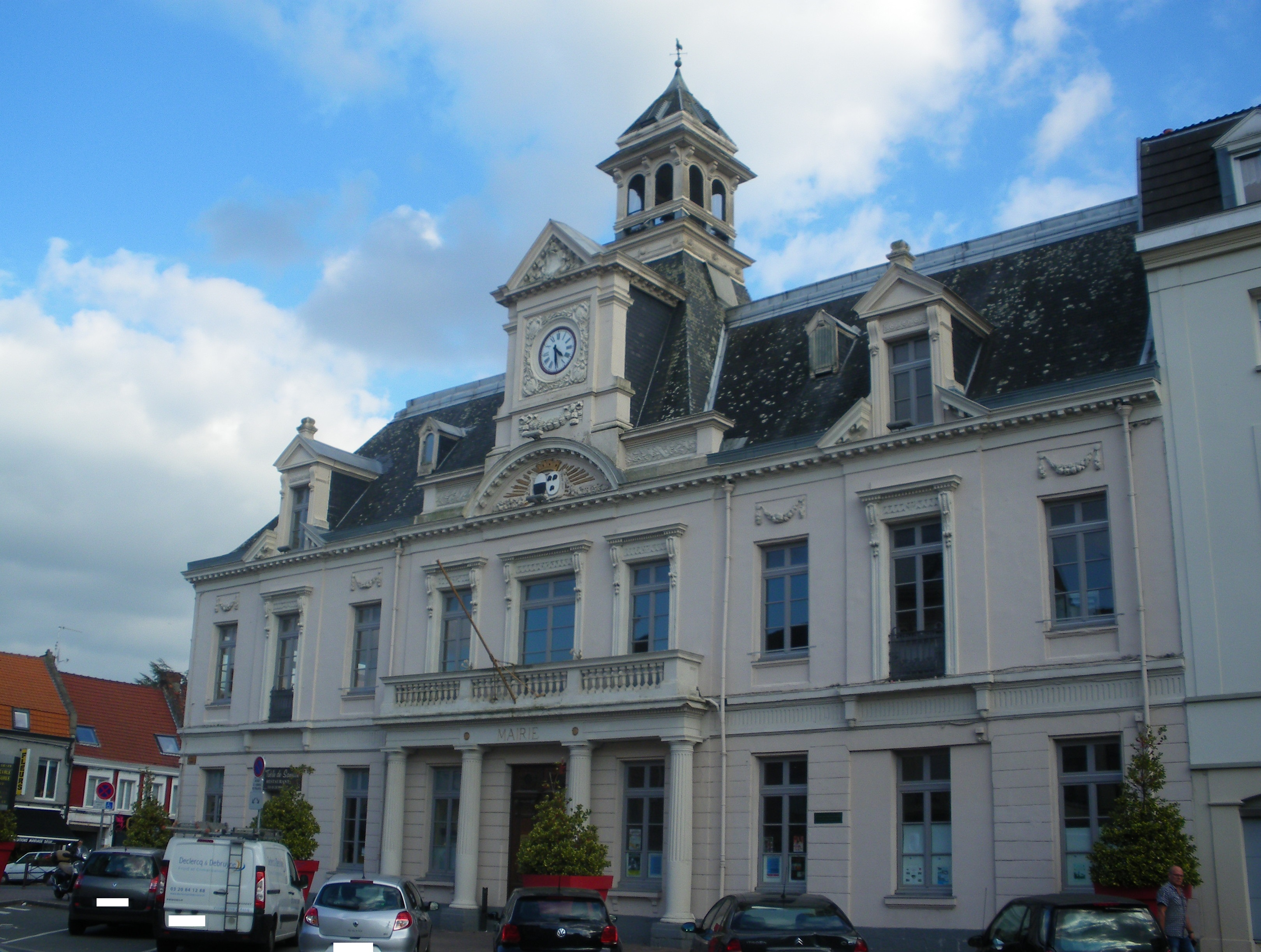
- The town hall in Lannoy

- Coat of arms
- Location of Lannoy
- Location within France Location within Hauts-de-France
- Coordinates: 50°40′00″N 3°12′41″E
- Country: France
- Region: Hauts-de-France
- Department: Nord
- Arrondissement: Lille
- Canton: Croix
- Intercommunality: Métropole Européenne de Lille

Government
  - Mayor (2020–2026): Michel Colin
- Area^{1}: 0.18 km^{2} (0.069 sq mi)
- Highest elevation: 32 m (105 ft)
- Lowest elevation: 28 m (92 ft)
- Population (2023): 1,812
  - Density: 10,000/km^{2} (26,000/sq mi)
- Time zone: UTC+01:00 (CET)
  - Summer (DST): UTC+02:00 (CEST)
- INSEE/Postal code: 59332 /59390
- ^{1} French Land Register data, which excludes lakes, ponds, glaciers > 1 km^{2} (0.386 sq mi or 247 acres) and river estuaries.

Lannoy (French pronunciation: [lanwa]; Dutch: Lanno) is a commune in the Nord department in northern France.

== Heraldry ==
Arms of Lannoy	The arms of Lannoy are blazoned: Argent, 3 hounds sable.

== Geography ==
With a land area of only 0.18 km^{2} (0.069 sq mi), it is the third-smallest French commune (after Castelmoron-d'Albret and Vaudherland) by surface area. It also has the highest density of population of any commune outside of the Île-de-France region, slightly greater than that of the city of Lyon.

== People ==
- Léon Debouverie, politician
- Jean Piat, actor and writer

The de Lannoy family and the Delano family are both named for the town of Lannoy.

== See also ==
- Communes of the Nord department
