= Haute Borne =

Coordinates: 50.6032°N 3.1532°E

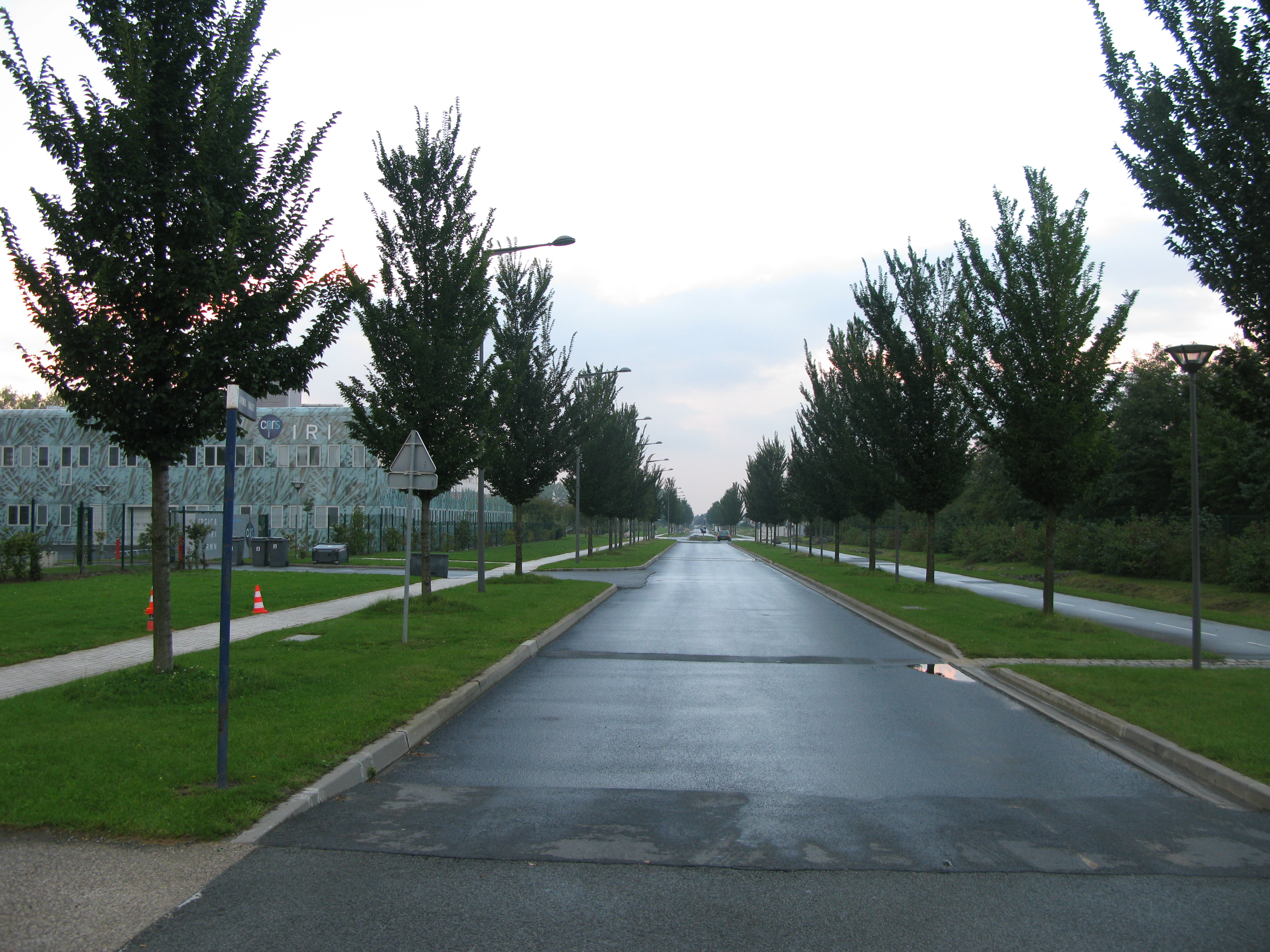
Haute Borne European scientific park.

Haute Borne is a new district of Villeneuve d'Ascq city, in France. It hosts the Haute Borne European scientific park. The aim of this area is to be home from high-tech companies and research and development centers, which can take advantage of laboratories and researchers of the University of Lille close to Haute Borne.

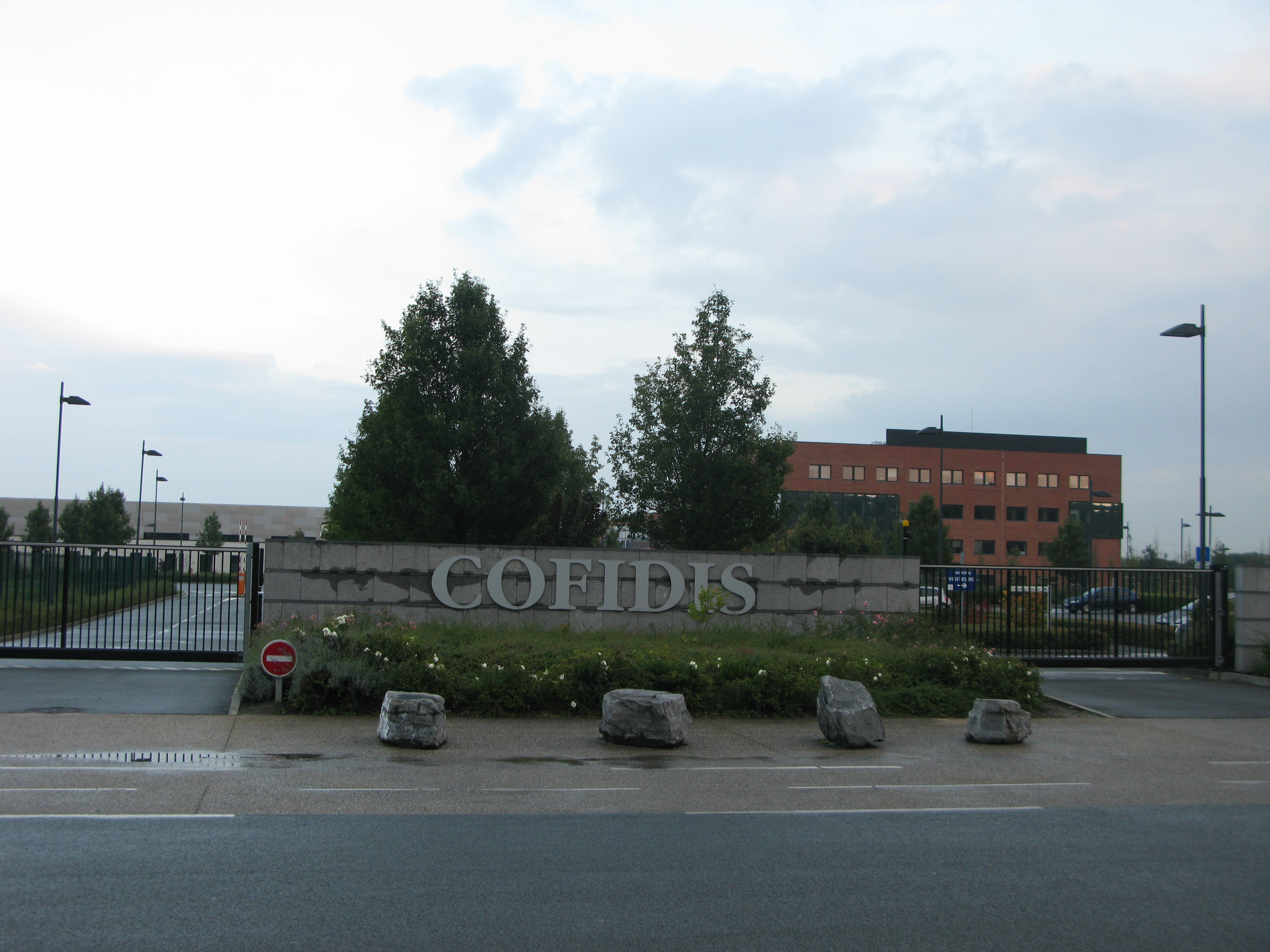
Cofidis head office.

Haute Borne hosts notably French National Centre for Scientific Research, National Institute for Research in Computer Science and Control, Ajilon IT, Cofidis, McCain Foods, Tate & Lyle and Xerox.
