= 3 Suisses =

- Company type: Company
- Industry: Mail order and e-commerce
- Headquarters: Paris, Île-de-France 75116, FR, France
- Key people: Everett Hutt (CEO of Groups 3SI)- Karine Schrenzel (CEO)
- Owner: Otto GmbH
- Parent: Groupe 3SI
- Website: Official website

3 Suisses is a French mail order and e-commerce company, with headquarters in Villeneuve-d'Ascq. It is the biggest of the 16 e-commerce brands of Groupe 3SI. Karine Schrenzel is the current CEO as of 2018.

Since 1981, Otto GmbH owned a 51% share in the company and has been its only shareholder since January 2014.

In 1987, 3 Suisses and L'Oréal founded Le Club des Créateurs de Beauté specializing in mail order sales of cosmetic products.

In 2010, Alexandre Vauthier created a clothing line for 3 Suisses.

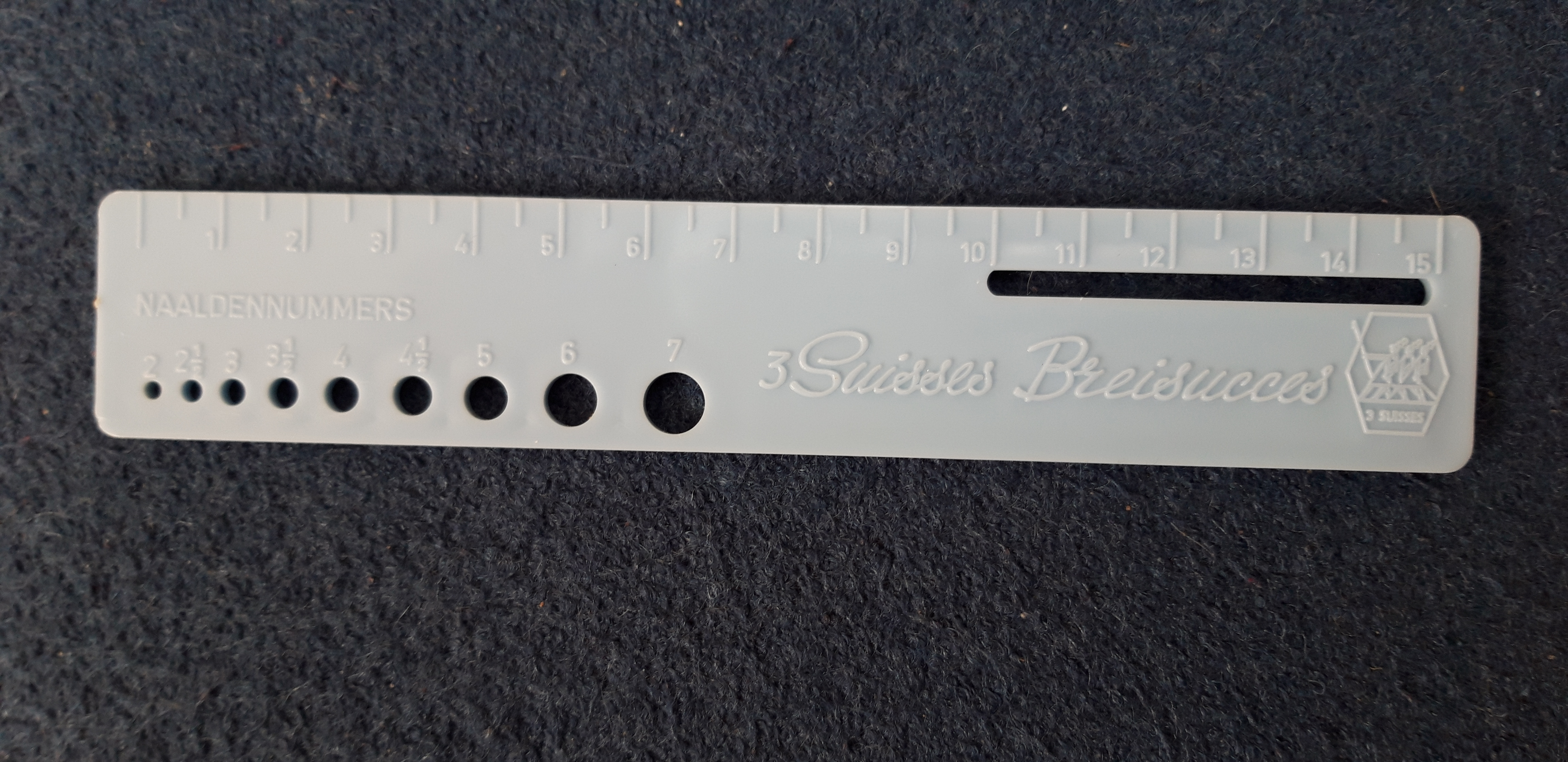
Hook gauge of 3 Suisses

== See also ==
- La Redoute
