= Flers-lez-Lille =

Former commune in France

Coordinates: 50°38′N 3°08′E

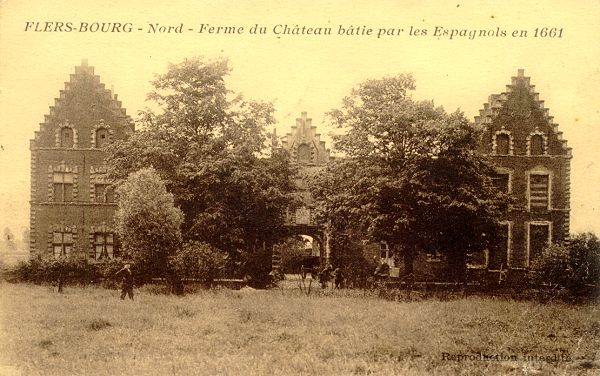
Jielbeaumadier flers chateau

Flers-lez-Lille (French pronunciation: [flɛʁs le lil], lit. 'Flers near Lille') is a former commune in the Nord department in northern France, merged into Villeneuve-d'Ascq in 1970.

== Heraldry ==
Arms of Flers-lez-Lille	The arms of Flers-lez-Lille are blazoned : Gules, a chief chequy argent and azure.

== See also ==
- Communes of the Nord department
