= Villeneuve-d'Ascq =

Villeneuve-d'Ascq Neuvile-Ask (Picard)
- Commune
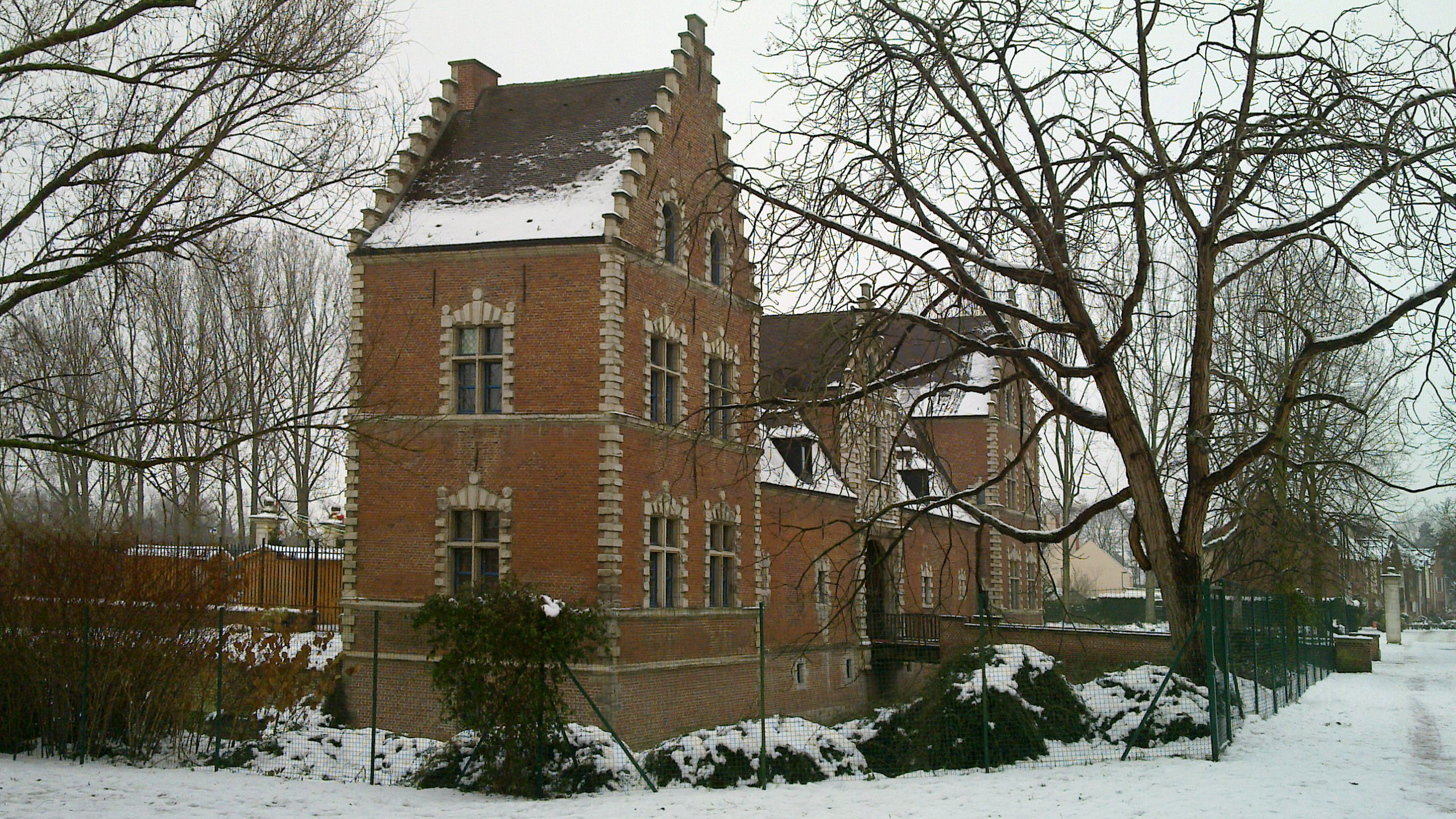
- Château de Flers

- Coat of arms
- Location of Villeneuve-d'Ascq
- Location within France Location within Hauts-de-France
- Coordinates: 50°37′24″N 3°08′42″E
- Country: France
- Region: Hauts-de-France
- Department: Nord
- Arrondissement: Lille
- Canton: Villeneuve-d'Ascq
- Intercommunality: Métropole Européenne de Lille

Government
  - Mayor (2020–2026): Gérard Caudron
- Area^{1}: 22.66 km^{2} (8.75 sq mi)
- Highest elevation: 46 m (151 ft)
- Lowest elevation: 19 m (62 ft)
- Population (2023): 62,868
  - Density: 2,774/km^{2} (7,186/sq mi)
- Time zone: UTC+01:00 (CET)
  - Summer (DST): UTC+02:00 (CEST)
- INSEE/Postal code: 59009 /59491, 59493, 59650
- ^{1} French Land Register data, which excludes lakes, ponds, glaciers > 1 km^{2} (0.386 sq mi or 247 acres) and river estuaries.

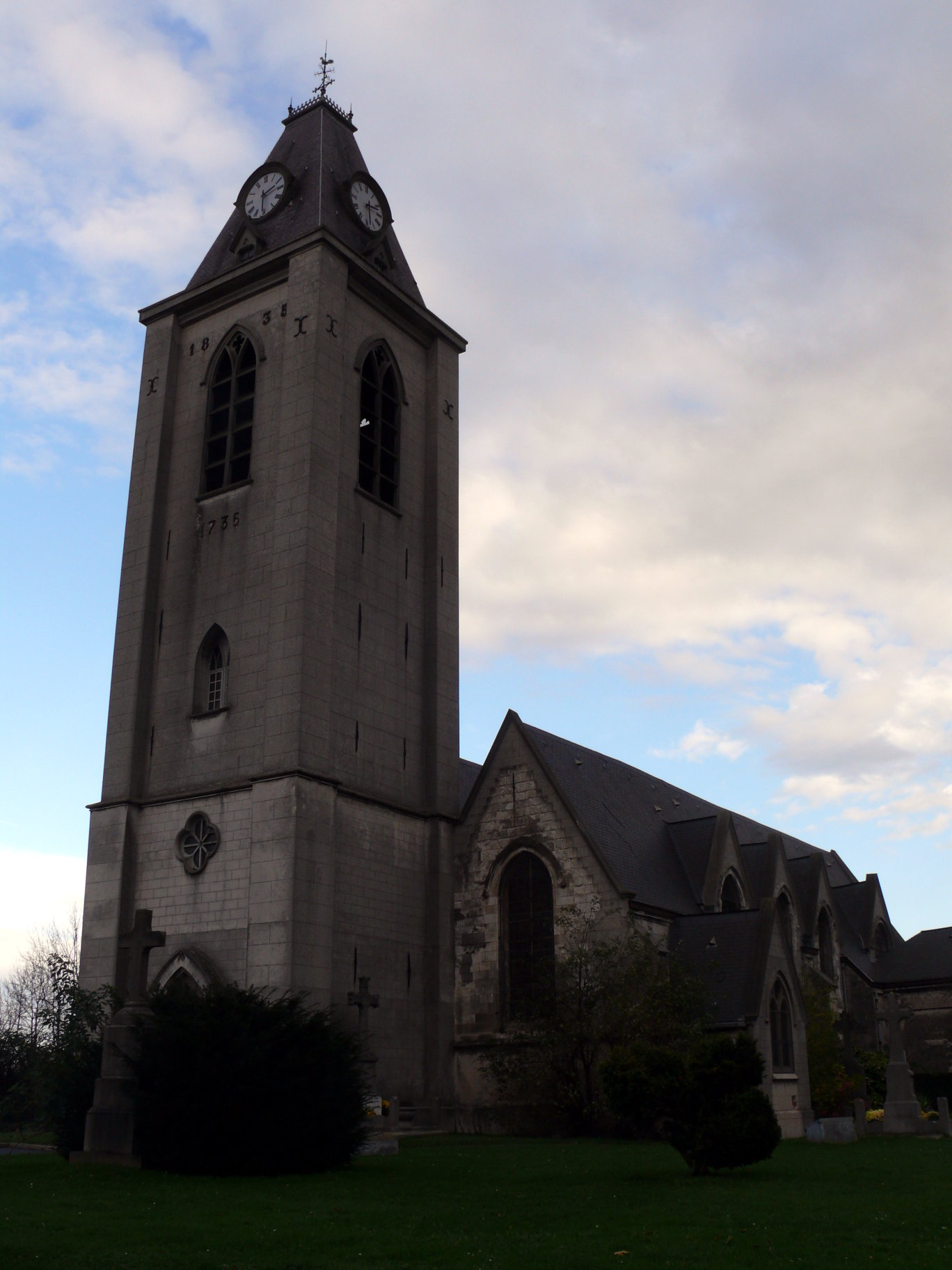
Saint-Sébastien d'Annappes church

Villeneuve-d'Ascq (French pronunciation: [vilnœvdask]; Picard: Neuvile-Ask) is a commune in the Nord department in northern France. With more than 60,000 inhabitants and 50,000 students, it is one of the main cities of the Lille metropolitan area (Métropole Européenne de Lille) and the largest in area (27.46 km^{2}) after the city of Lille itself. It is also one of the main cities of the Hauts-de-France region.

Built up owing to the merger between the former communes of Ascq, Annappes and Flers-lez-Lille, Villeneuve-d'Ascq is a new town and the cradle of the first automatic metro system in the world (VAL).

Villeneuve-d'Ascq is nicknamed the 'green technopole' thanks to the presence of many researchers as well as two campuses of the University of Lille and several graduate engineering schools. Owing in part to its activity centres, its Haute Borne European scientific park and two shopping malls, Villeneuve-d'Ascq is one of the main economic spots of the Hauts-de-France region. Multinational corporations such as Bonduelle, Cofidis and Decathlon have their head office there.

Outside its academic, scientific and business facilities, Villeneuve-d'Ascq is known for its sporting events, boasting two stadiums (Stade Pierre-Mauroy and Stadium Lille Métropole) and some top division sports teams, its museums, e.g. the Lille Métropole Museum of Modern, Contemporary and Outsider Art), its green spaces, and its facilities for disabled people.

== Name ==
Its name means "new city of Ascq" in French. Ascq is possibly derived from the Dutch word for "ash". The name of the city is generally written without the customary (official) hyphen.

== Geography ==
The city counts approximately 10 km^{2} (3.9 sq mi) of greenspace, lakes, forests and arable lands. It is located between Lille and Roubaix, at the crossroads of the principal freeways towards Paris, Ghent, Antwerp and Brussels.

== History ==
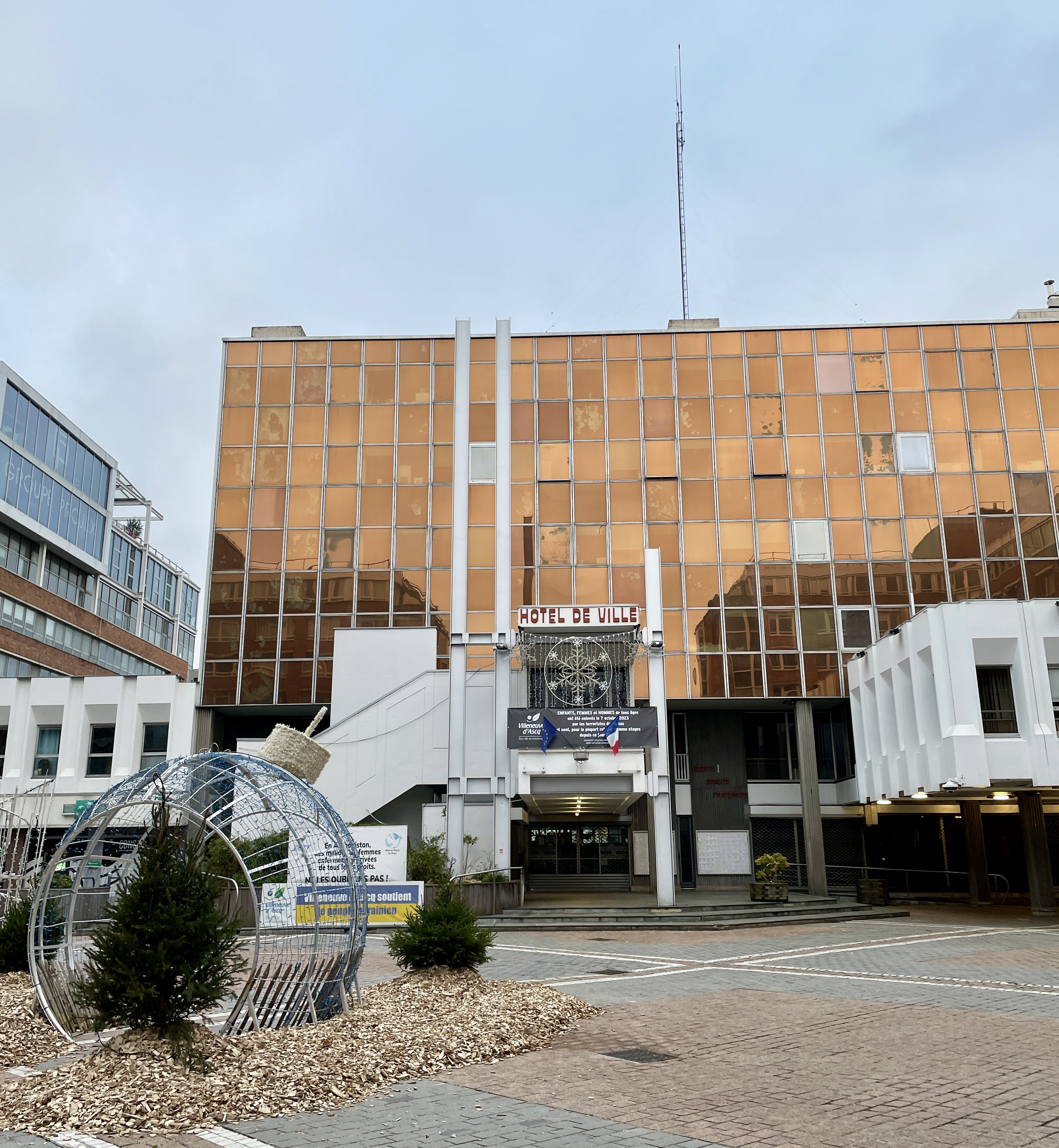
The Hôtel de Ville

Development on what is now Villeneuve-d'Ascq can be traced back to the Celtic Gaul era, and are anchored in two feudal mounds, a Gallo-Roman site and a Carolingian one.

The area was selected in the 1960s to accommodate a new town then designated the name Lille-Est, which was to channel the growth of the agglomeration of Lille city and development of institutions based in the area. The commune of Villeneuve-d'Ascq was created in 1970 by the amalgamation of the communes of Ascq, Annappes and Flers. Its name evokes at the same time the new (neuve) and the old: former commune Ascq and its memory as martyr town of 1 April 1944, date on which the Nazis massacred 86 men (Ascq massacre).

The city's merger with Lille was contentious and failed twice (1972 and 1976). The Hôtel de Ville was completed in 1977.

== Population ==
Data before 1970 in the table and graph below refer to the old commune Annappes, before the merger with Ascq and Flers-lez-Lille.

Historical population

Year	Pop.	±% p.a.
1793	1,221	—
1800	1,161	−0.72%
1806	1,185	+0.34%
1821	1,356	+0.90%
1831	1,650	+1.98%
1836	1,664	+0.17%
1841	1,821	+1.82%
1846	1,943	+1.31%
1851	1,962	+0.19%
1856	2,050	+0.88%
1861	2,118	+0.65%
1866	2,232	+1.05%
1872	2,307	+0.55%
1876	2,357	+0.54%
1881	2,651	+2.38%
1886	2,713	+0.46%
1891	2,858	+1.05%
1896	2,860	+0.01%
1901	3,014	+1.05%

Year	Pop.	±% p.a.
1906	2,956	−0.39%
1911	3,026	+0.47%
1921	3,020	−0.02%
1926	3,127	+0.70%
1931	3,221	+0.59%
1936	3,350	+0.79%
1946	3,553	+0.59%
1954	3,751	+0.68%
1962	5,373	+4.59%
1968	11,618	+13.72%
1975	36,769	+17.89%
1982	59,527	+7.12%
1990	65,320	+1.17%
1999	65,042	−0.05%
2007	61,630	−0.67%
2012	62,308	+0.22%
2017	63,408	+0.35%
2023	62,868	−0.14%

Source: EHESS and INSEE (1968-2023)

== Economy ==
=== Businesses and public organizations ===
Different kinds of businesses have their headquarters in Villeneuve d'Ascq because of the availability of land, the presence of researchers (in particular in the Cité Scientifique and Haute Borne) and the proximity to both Benelux and Paris economic regions. Villeneuve d'Ascq notably hosts the headquarters of the food processing company Bonduelle, the financial services provider Cofidis, the sporting goods retailer Decathlon, the chocolate manufacturer Bouquet d'Or, the disposable dishes manufacturer Tifany Industrie, the IT security company Netasq, the restaurant chains Flunch, Les 3 Brasseurs, Pizza Paï.

Furthermore, Villeneuve d'Ascq hosts the Europe, the Middle East and Africa headquarters of IT consulting company SoftThinks and the European headquarters and R&D center of Canadian frozen foods company McCain Foods. It is home to the central buying service of international retail group Auchan, a R&D center of multinational agri-processor Tate & Lyle, and a data processing center of American company Xerox.

Villeneuve d'Ascq also hosts numerous administration and public organizations offices. The Northern headquarters of French national meteorological service Météo-France, large barracks of the National Gendarmerie (450 gendarmes and their family), the Northern headquarters of the Regional Center for Traffic Information and Coordination (fr:Centre régional d'information et de circulation routière). Since 1998, there are large offices of the mobile network operator and Internet service provider Orange, along with the information computing center of Électricité de France for the Northern and Western France region.

From 1984 to 1994 Villeneuve d'Ascq housed a Groupe Bull factory that developed, manufactured and marketed desktops personal computers; the site is currently used by offices of Decathlon. There was also a Rhône-Poulenc chemical factory, now housing offices of mail order company 3 Suisses.

Villeneuve d'Ascq hosts the Northern head office of Textile and Clothing French Institute (IFTH) which assist industry for their technological and economical development. Finally, 2000 businesses are implanted in the city.

=== Shops and trade ===
Two huge shopping centers are located in the technopole. The indoor/roofed Centre commercial V2, founded in 1977, which, when created, was the largest shopping center north of Paris and is still the largest in the Nord-Pas-de-Calais area. A new outdoor one opened in 2009, Heron Parc, a 13,000 m^{2} (139,931 sq ft) shopping center located near V2, hosting numerous stores of Groupe Auchan and a 12 auditoriums movie theater.

== Education and science ==
Villeneuve d'Ascq is the first academic pole of the metropolitan area. Numerous academic and scientific facilities are located there (around 42,000 students and 2,500 researchers).

=== Universities and tertiary institutions ===
The city hosts two main campuses of the University of Lille : "Cité Scientifique" (Science and Technology); and "Pont de Bois" (Social sciences, Humanities, Literature and Arts). Those two campuses count a half of the Community of Universities and Institutions (COMUE) Lille Nord de France students.

Villeneuve d'Ascq hosts also a University Institute for Technology (IUT A), the school in architecture École nationale supérieure d'architecture et de paysage de Lille, along with five graduate schools : École centrale de Lille, École nationale supérieure de chimie de Lille, Polytech'Lille (formerly EUDIL), École des Mines-Télécom de Lille-Douai (IMT) (formerly ENIC, TELECOM LILLE), École supérieure des techniques industrielles et des textiles (ESTIT).

=== Primary and secondary education ===
There are 20 public maternelles (preschools/nurseries), 17 public élémentaires (primary schools), and 6 public combined preschools and elementary schools. There are also five public collèges (junior high schools): Camille Claudel, Simone de Beauvoir, Molière, Rimbaud, and Triolo. The two public lycées (senior high schools/sixth-form colleges) in the commune are Lycée Raymond Queneau and Lycée professionnel Dinah Derycke.

There is one combined private elementary through high school, École Saint-Adrien. There is also a private junior high school, Collège privé communautaire; and four private combined preschool and elementary schools, Notre-Dame, Saint-Pierre d'Ascq, Cardinal Liénart, and Saint-Henri.

=== Miscellaneous education ===
200 public and private laboratories whose 31 of them members of French National Centre for Scientific Research are located in the technopole. Some main research institute are situated in Villeneuve d'Ascq, for example IEMN (Institut d'électronique de microélectronique et de nanotechnologie), INRIA Lille (National Institute for Research in Computer Science and Control), IFSTTAR (Institut national de recherche sur les transports et leur sécurité), INRA (Institut National de la Recherche Agronomique), the veterinary laboratory of the Nord department, l'IRIS (Institut de recherche de l'industrie sucrière), ITF-Nord (Institut textile de France).

At last but not least, the technopole hosts the European scientific park Haute Borne, 150 hectare next to Université Lille 1.

== Administration ==
Having succeeded Gérard Caudron as mayor from 1977 to 2001, Jean-Michel Stievenard and his team wish to maintain balances the environnement and the economic development, the greenery and technology, the daily wellbeing and the great projects, the social one and quality, opening on its internal comfort and rest of the world, its finance and high degree of public utility. The mayors of Villeneuve-d'Ascq since 1977 have been members of the Socialist Party (Parti socialiste).In 2008, the local elections brought back to the city council Gerard Caudron as mayor.

Villeneuve-d'Ascq is the seat of the canton of Villeneuve-d'Ascq.

== Transport ==
As a part of the Métropole Européenne de Lille, Villeneuve-d'Ascq is connected to Lille city centre by a VAL, a type of fully automatic (driverless) light rubber-tired metro. The VAL metro line runs through Villeneuve-d'Ascq from Quatre-Cantons and Cité Scientifique stations and drives up to Lille historical city centre and railways stations in about ten minutes.

In fact, while the acronym VAL now officially stands for Véhicule Automatique Léger (automatic light vehicle), it was originally for Villeneuve-d'Ascq à Lille (meaning Villeneuve-d'Ascq to Lille), the route of the first line to be projected, and inaugurated on 25 April 1983. The Villeneuve d'Ascq metro station is under the Place Salvador Allende (Salvadore Allende Square) and a shopping centre which includes Auchan as one of its main tenants.

Villeneuve-d'Ascq is also served by the train station Gare d'Ascq, which offers connections to Lille, Orchies and Tournai and Liège in Belgium.

== Sport ==
=== Honours and statistics ===
The city received many awards for its sporting activities. In 1994, the newspaper L'Equipe ranked Villeneuve d'Ascq in the five most sportive cities in France. In 1996, Villeneuve d'Ascq was elected the 'most sportive city of France', and in 1999, 'the most disabled sportive city'. It is a logical result because the city invests a lot in sport.

In 2009, 21,700 inhabitants had a sport licence in the sport club of Villeneuve d'Ascq (one third of the global population of the city); the city hosts 158 different sport associations, 58 different sports and 14% of the city operating budget is dedicated to sport.

The city has 10.99 hectares of soccer and rugby fields, 5,010 m^{2} (53,927 sq ft) of track and field facilities and 30 km (19 mi) of hiking trails.

=== Facilities ===
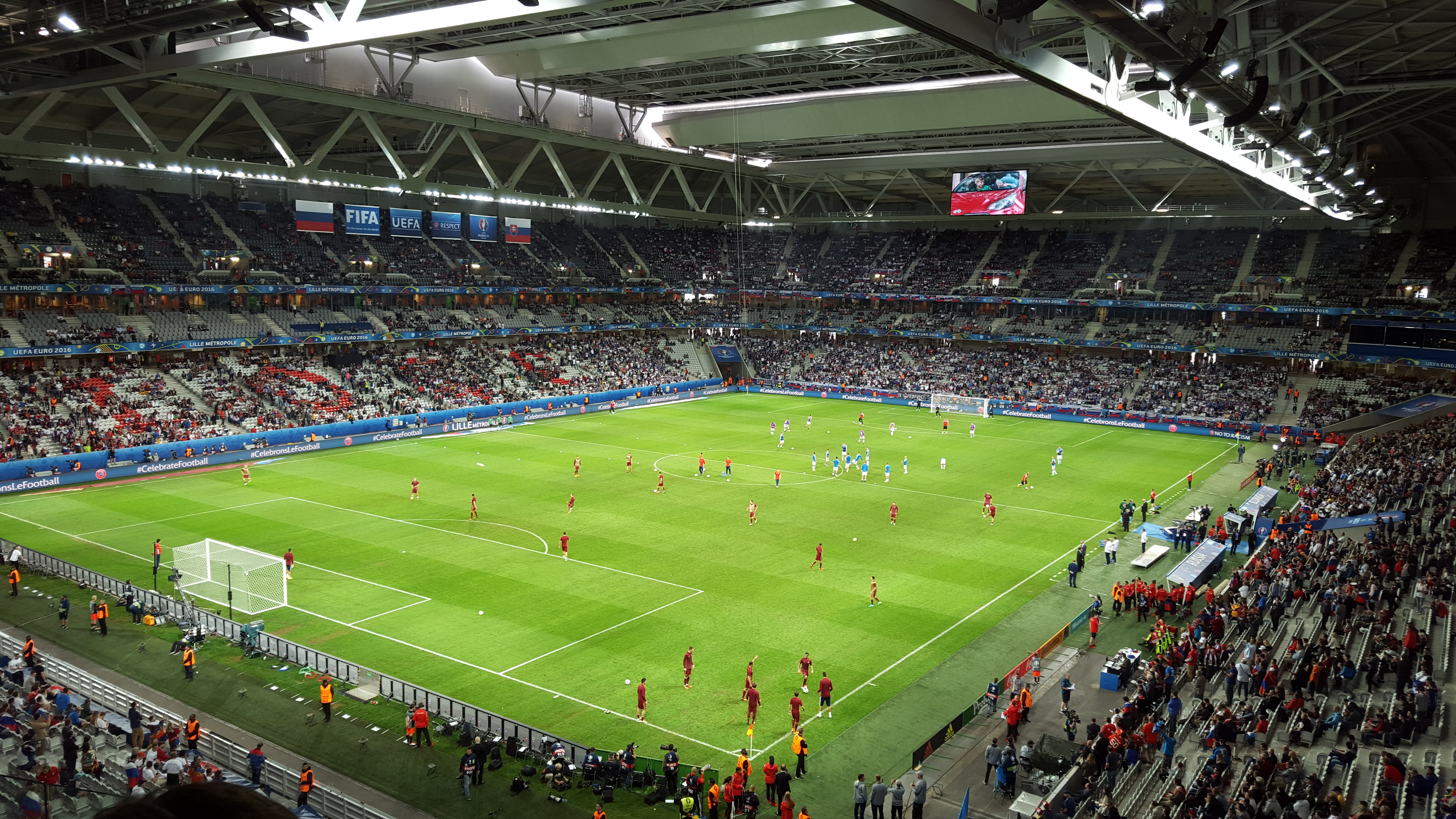
Stade Pierre-Mauroy

Villeneuve d'Ascq has two swimming pools ('piscine du Triolo' and 'centre nautique Babylone') both equipped with a 50m long water slide, an outside grass area, saunas and a training gym.

The city hosts two major stadiums, Stadium Lille Métropole (21,650 seats) and Stade Pierre-Mauroy (50,186 seats).

Villeneuve d'Ascq have 16 soccer fields, 2 rugby fields (stadium E. Théry, Tradition street), 17 municipal gymnasiums plus 8 academic gymnasiums (E.S.U.M.), a sport complex called 'Palacium' (Pont de Bois avenue) and a gymnasium (salle d'Agrees, Breughel street) dedicated to gymnastics.

The city hosts a sailing base, two shooting galleries, a bow and arrow gallery, two golf courses, 12 tennis courts, two athletics facilities (Parmentier street and Lieutenant Colpin street).

Finally, we can find in Villeneuve d'Ascq two dojos, a big wall for wall-climbing (salle Tamise), a bourloire in Ascq, a boulodrome in Residence and a bowling in Hôtel de Ville.

=== Sporting events and teams ===
==== Football ====
Villeneuve d'Ascq is home to several football teams which play in the Nord-Pas-de-Calais football league, in Flandre district: US Ascq (promotion d'honneur), Villeneuve d'Ascq Métropole (promotion d'honneur) and Flers OS Villeneuve d'Ascq (1ère division de district).

The Stadium Nord hosted two international exhibition games: France - Tunisia in 1978 and France - Armenia in 1996. The Stadium Nord is the official stadium of the Lille Olympique Sporting Club Lille Métropole team (Ligue 1) since the 2004–2005 season, and also the official stadium of the Entente Sportive de Wasquehal team since 1997–1998 season (formerly Ligue 2, today CFA 2). In 1997, Stadium Nord was the home stadium of the Royal Excelsior Mouscron for the UEFA Europa League. The stadium hosted the UEFA Europa League matches of Lille Olympique Sporting Club Lille Métropole, so prestigious clubs such as Fenerbahçe SK, FC Sevilla, Valencia CF and Liverpool FC came to Villeneuve d'Ascq.

In 2010, the Fédération française de football organised in Stadium Nord the Festifoot féminin, an event with 500 feminine soccer player footballeuses. The France women's national football team were there and also some women's international footballers.

In May, 2010 Stade Pierre-Mauroy was selected by the Fédération française de football (FFF) to host matches in the UEFA Euro 2016, hosted by France.

==== Rugby ====
Villeneuve d'Ascq is home to a rugby union team, Lille Métropole Rugby Club Villeneuvois (ex-Rugby Club Villeneuve d'Ascq), whose senior women's team takes part in France women's rugby union championship. The women's team is in Division 1 since 1999 and in Elite since his victory ath the Challenge Armelle Auclair in 2006.

The Stadium Nord hosted the quarter-final of Rugby World cup in 1991 New Zealand vs. Canada (36 000 spectators). It also hosted the semi-final of European Rugby Cup 2000-2001 Stade français vs. Munster. In 2005, Stadium Nord hosted matches from the under 17 y.o. rugby tournament.

The Stadium Nord frequently hosts exhibition matches of the France rugby A team.

=== Track and field ===
The Stadium Nord hosts every year since 1988 an international meeting of track and field (formerly called meeting open Gaz de France, then Open du Nord and now meeting d'athlétisme Lille Métropole). The meeting is part of the national athleticism league since 2007.

In Stadium Nord took place the Track and field European Cup in 1995 and the Disabled Track and field World Cup in 2002.

==== Other sports ====
Villeneuve d'Ascq has a famous basketball club, ESB Villeneuve-d'Ascq which plays in Ligue Féminine de Basketball.

The city has also an american football club, Vikings de Villeneuve d'Ascq (Division 2) and a handball club, Hand Ball Club Villeneuve d'Ascq (HBCV) (Division 2).

The cycling tournament Tour de France arrived in Villeneuve d'Ascq in 1988. Sportsmen who came from Villeneuve d'Ascq clubs include tennis players Sarah Pitkowski and Nathalie Dechy.

== Culture ==
The city keeps of its past of many vestiges, sites and equipment.

Villeneuve-d'Ascq possesses a famous museum, the Lille Métropole Museum of Modern, Contemporary and Outsider Art (LaM). One can visit the forum of sciences François Mitterrand, the rebuildings of a Gaulois village to the archeological park Asnapio.

== Twin towns – sister cities ==
Villeneuve-d'Ascq is twinned with:

- Haidari, Greece
- Iași, Romania
- Leverkusen, Germany
- Ouidah, Benin
- La Possession, Réunion, France
- Racibórz, Poland
- (United Kingdom) Stirling, Scotland, UK
- Tournai, Belgium

== Gallery ==
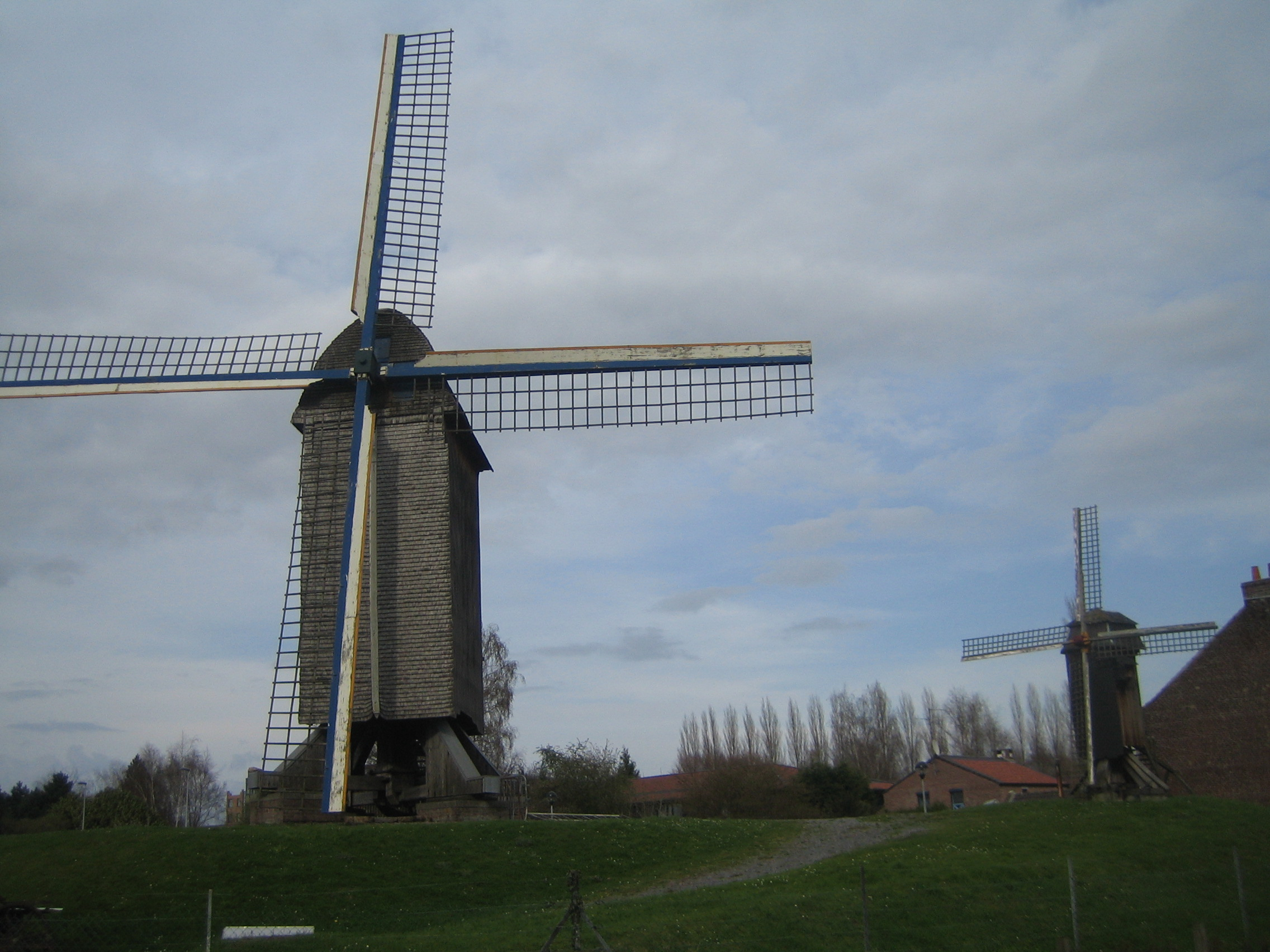
Windmill

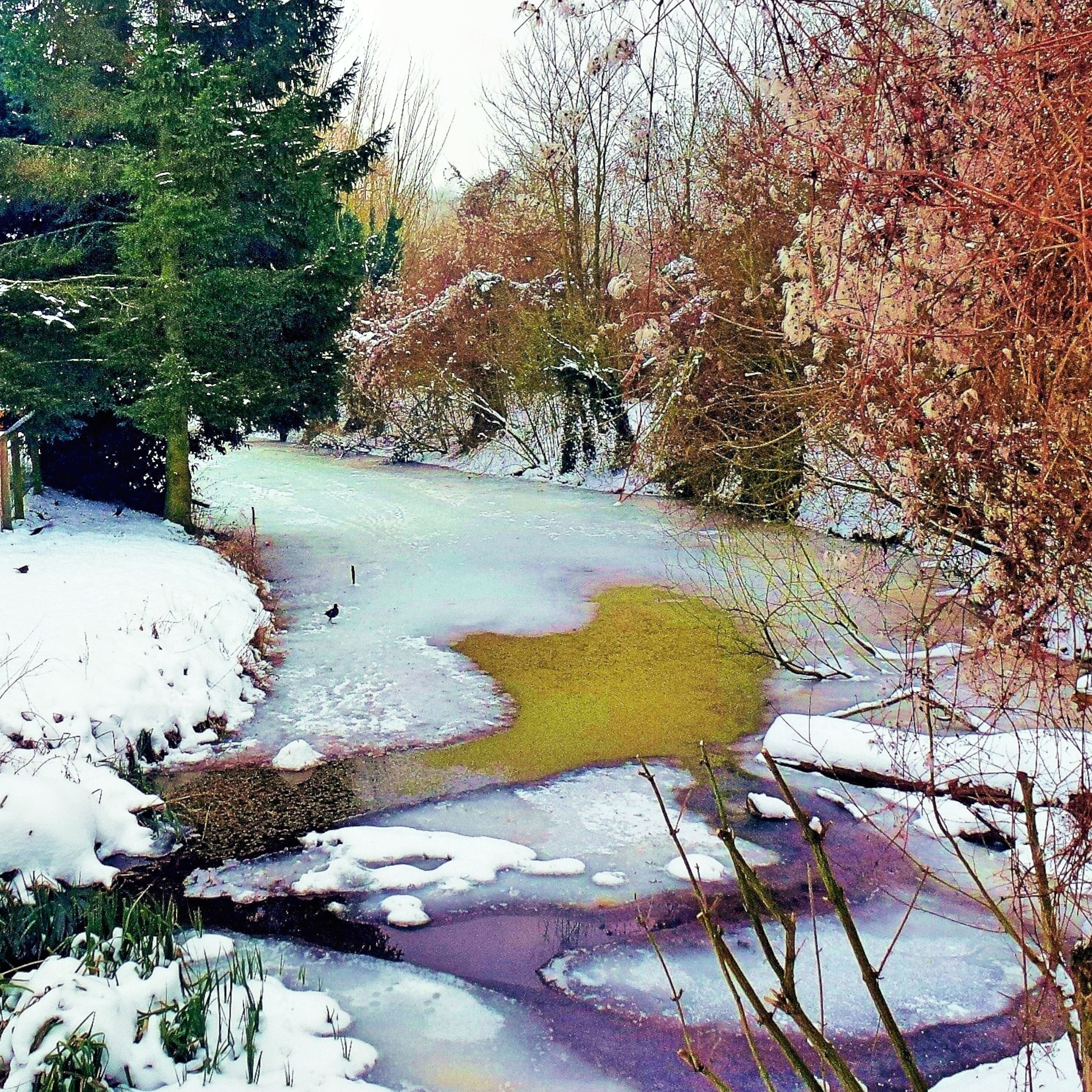
Winter in Parc du Héron

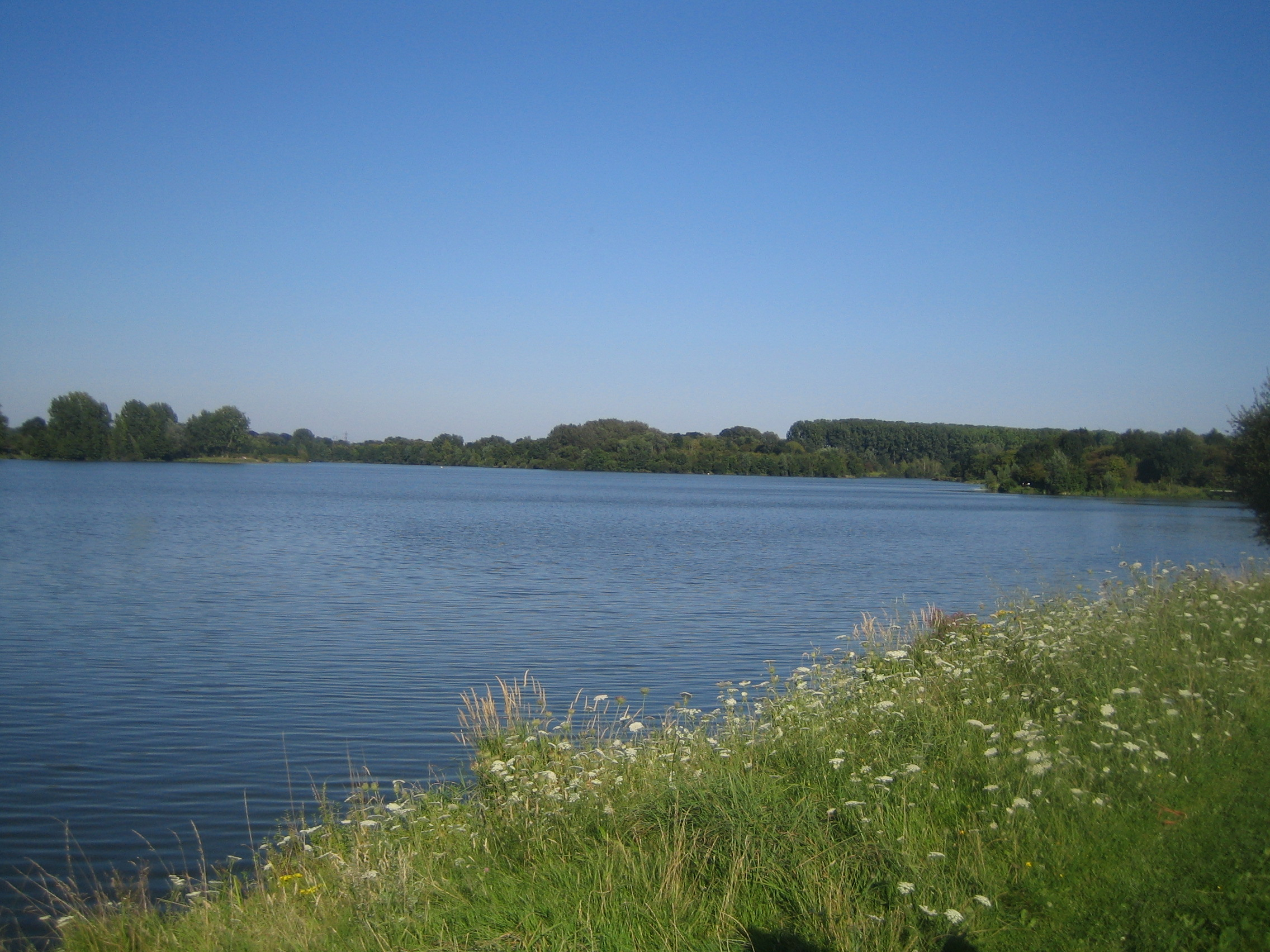
Lake of Héron

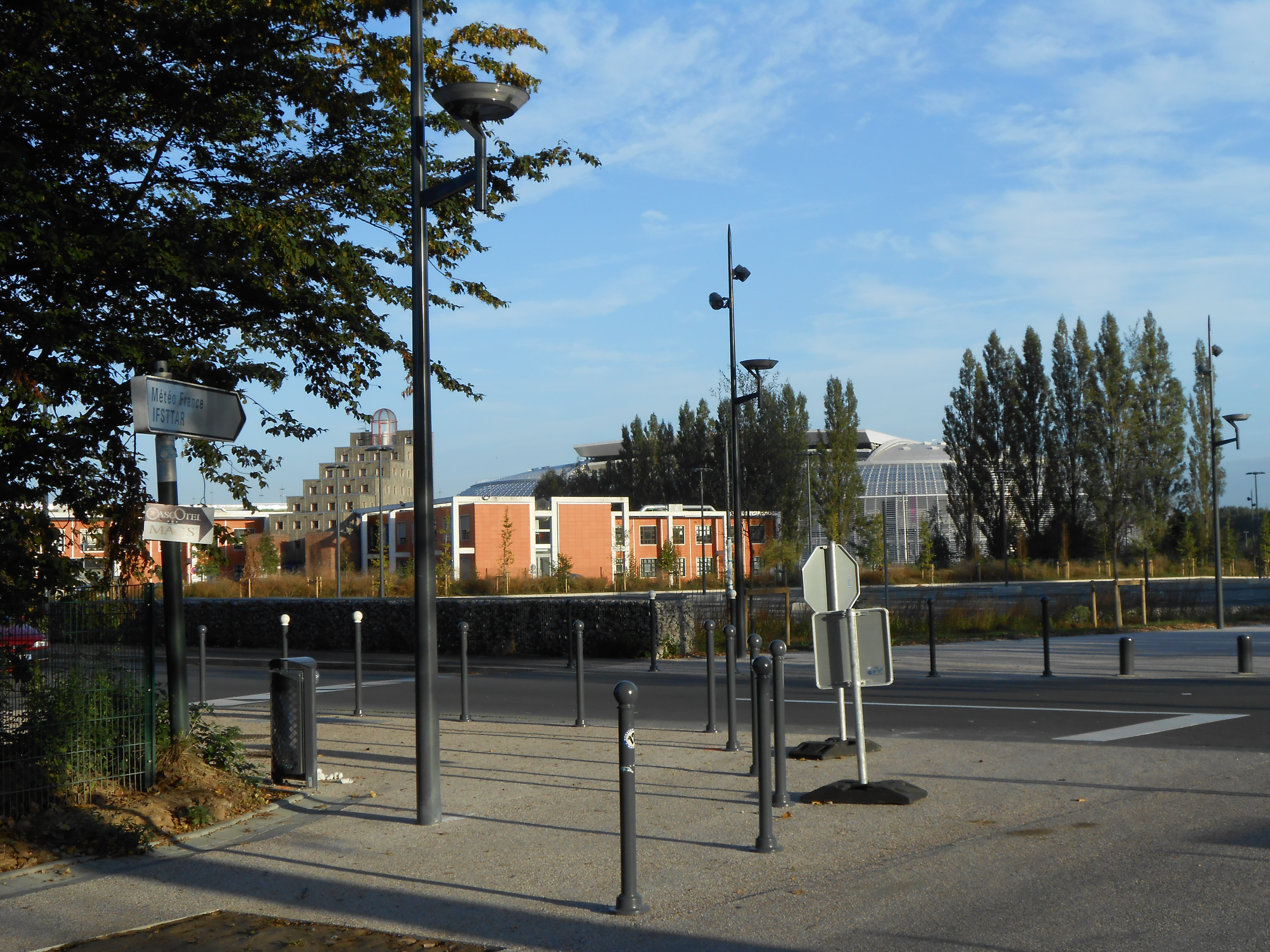
Cité scientifique

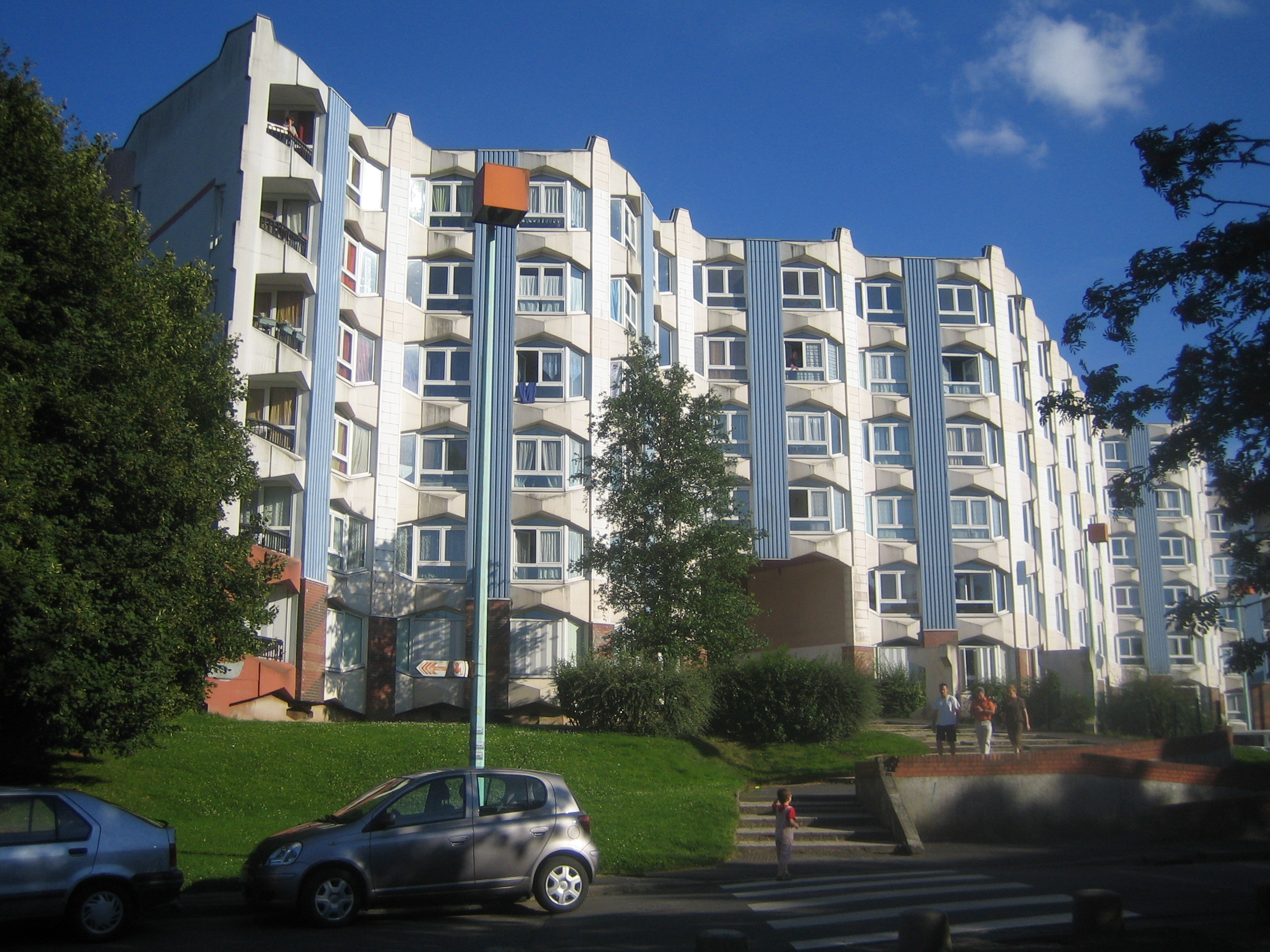
Cité scientifique

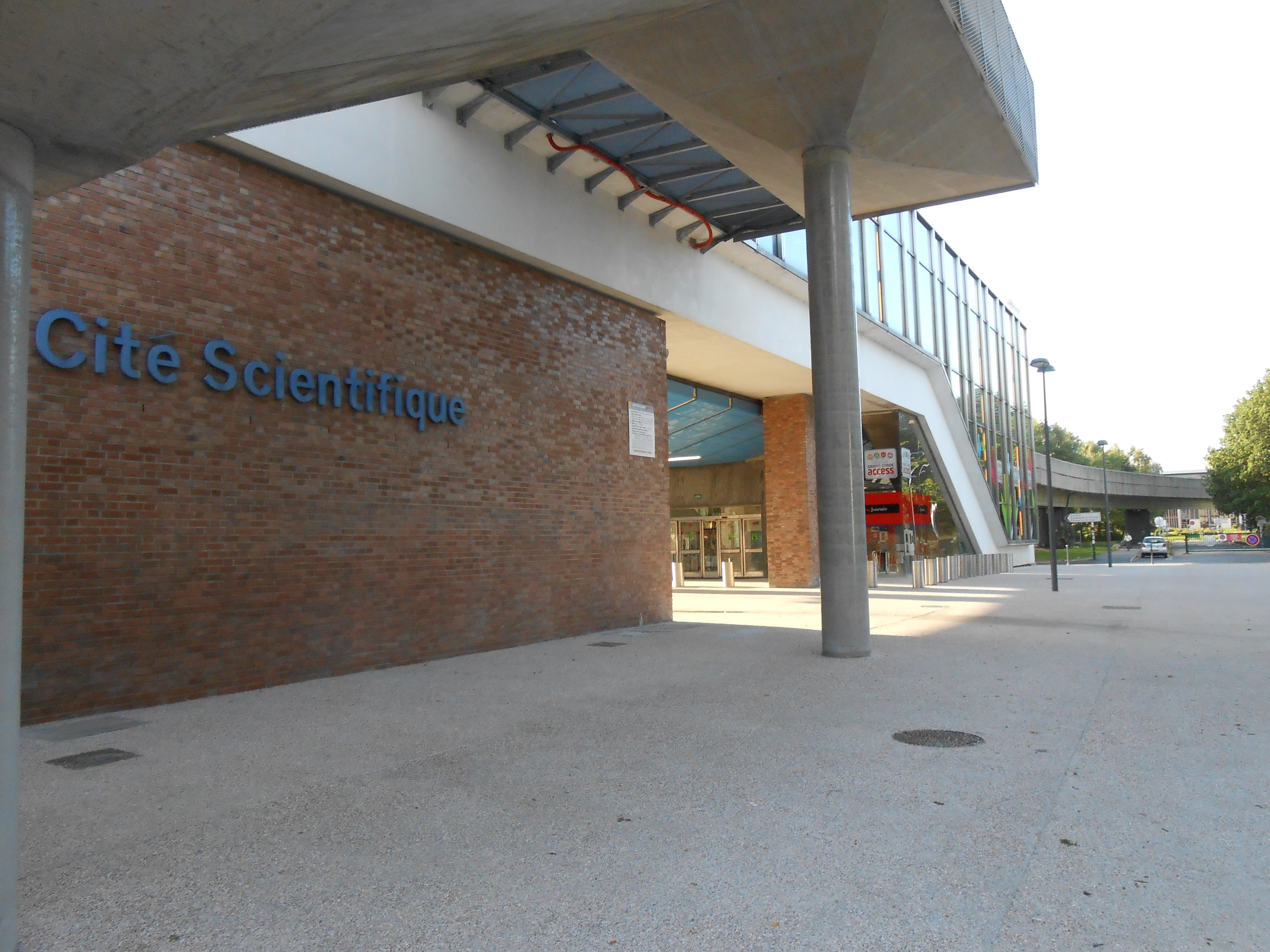
Cité scientifique

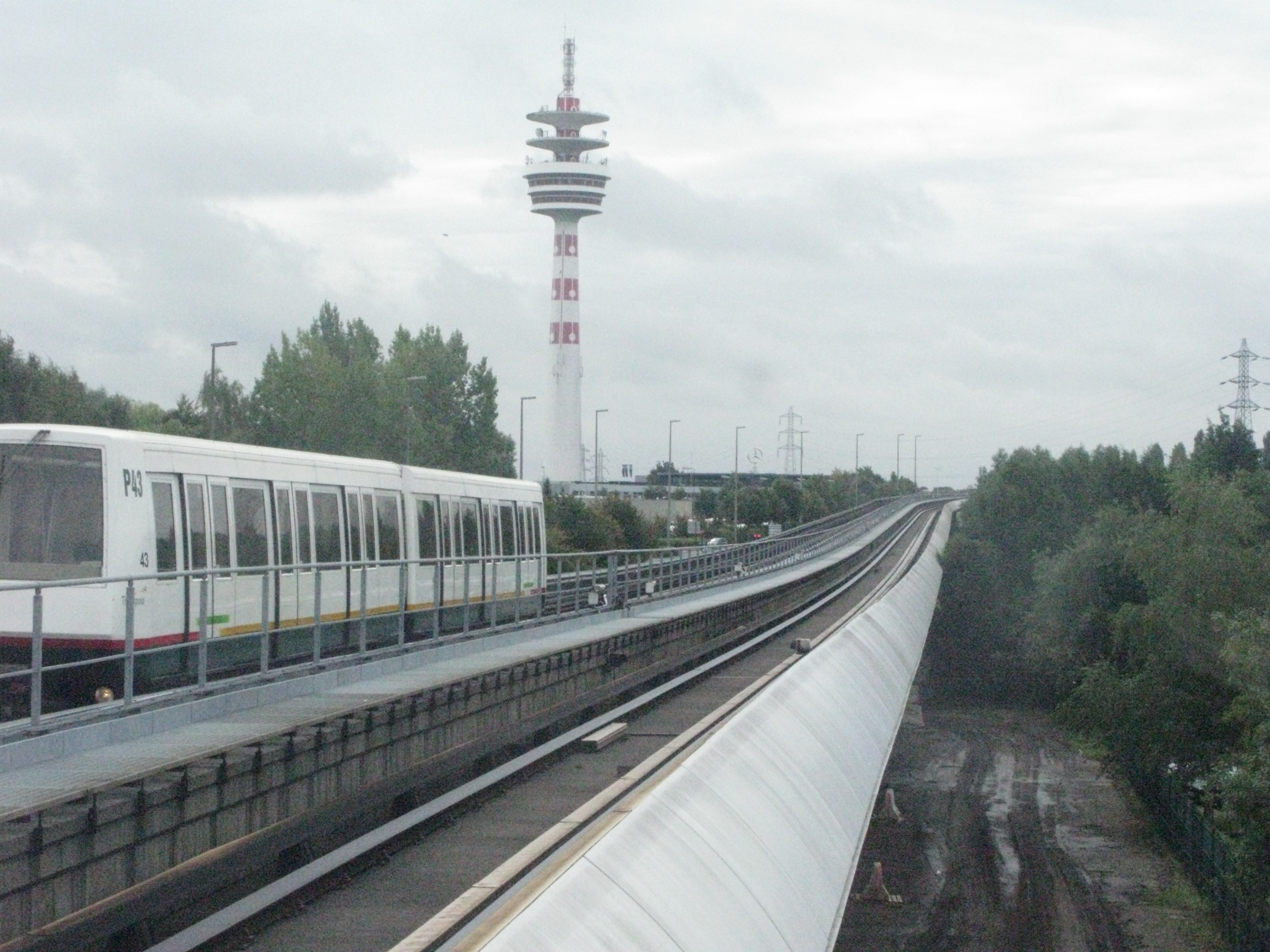
Cité scientifique

== See also ==
- Communes of the Nord department
