= Arrondissement of Kortrijk =

Arrondissement of Kortrijk Arrondissement Kortrijk
- Arrondissement
- Location of the arrondissement in West Flanders
- Coordinates: 50.85°N 3.3°E
- Country: Belgium
- Region: Flanders
- Province: West Flanders
- Municipalities: 12

Area
  - Total: 402.87 km^{2} (155.55 sq mi)

Population (1 January 2017)
  - Total: 287,823
  - Density: 714.43/km^{2} (1,850.4/sq mi)
- Time zone: UTC+1 (CET)
  - Summer (DST): UTC+2 (CEST)

The Arrondissement of Kortrijk (Dutch: Arrondissement Kortrijk; French: Arrondissement de Courtrai) is one of the eight administrative arrondissements in the Province of West Flanders, Belgium.

It is both an administrative and a judicial arrondissement. However, the Judicial Arrondissement of Kortrijk also comprises most municipalities in the Arrondissement of Roeselare (except Staden, Moorslede and Lichtervelde), as well as the southernmost municipalities of the Arrondissement of Tielt: Meulebeke, Dentergem, Oostrozebeke en Wielsbeke.

== History ==
The Arrondissement of Kortrijk was created in 1800 as the fourth arrondissement in the Department of Lys (Dutch: Departement Leie). It originally comprised the cantons of Avelgem, Harelbeke, Ingelmunster, Kortrijk, Menen, Meulebeke, Moorsele, Oostrozebeke and Roeselare.

In 1818, the canton of Avelgem was ceded to the new Arrondissement of Avelgem, the canton of Menen to the new Arrondissement of Menen, the canton of Roeselare to the new Arrondissement of Roeselare, the canton of Meulebeke to the new Arrondissement of Tielt and the cantons of Ingelmunster and Oostrozebeke to the new Arrondissement of Wakken. The arrondissements of Avelgem and Menen already ceased to exist in 1823 and were returned to the Arrondissement of Kortrijk.

When the language border was determined in 1963, Mouscron and the then municipalities of Luingne, Herseaux and Dottignies, as well as the neighbourhood of Risquons-Tout, which was located in the then municipality of Rekkem, were ceded to the newly formed Arrondissement of Mouscron.

== Municipalities ==
The Administrative Arrondissement of Kortrijk consists of the following municipalities:

- Anzegem
- Avelgem
- Deerlijk
- Harelbeke
- Kortrijk
- Kuurne
- Lendelede
- Menen
- Spiere-Helkijn
- Waregem
- Wevelgem
- Zwevegem
