= Ferrain =

- Natural region
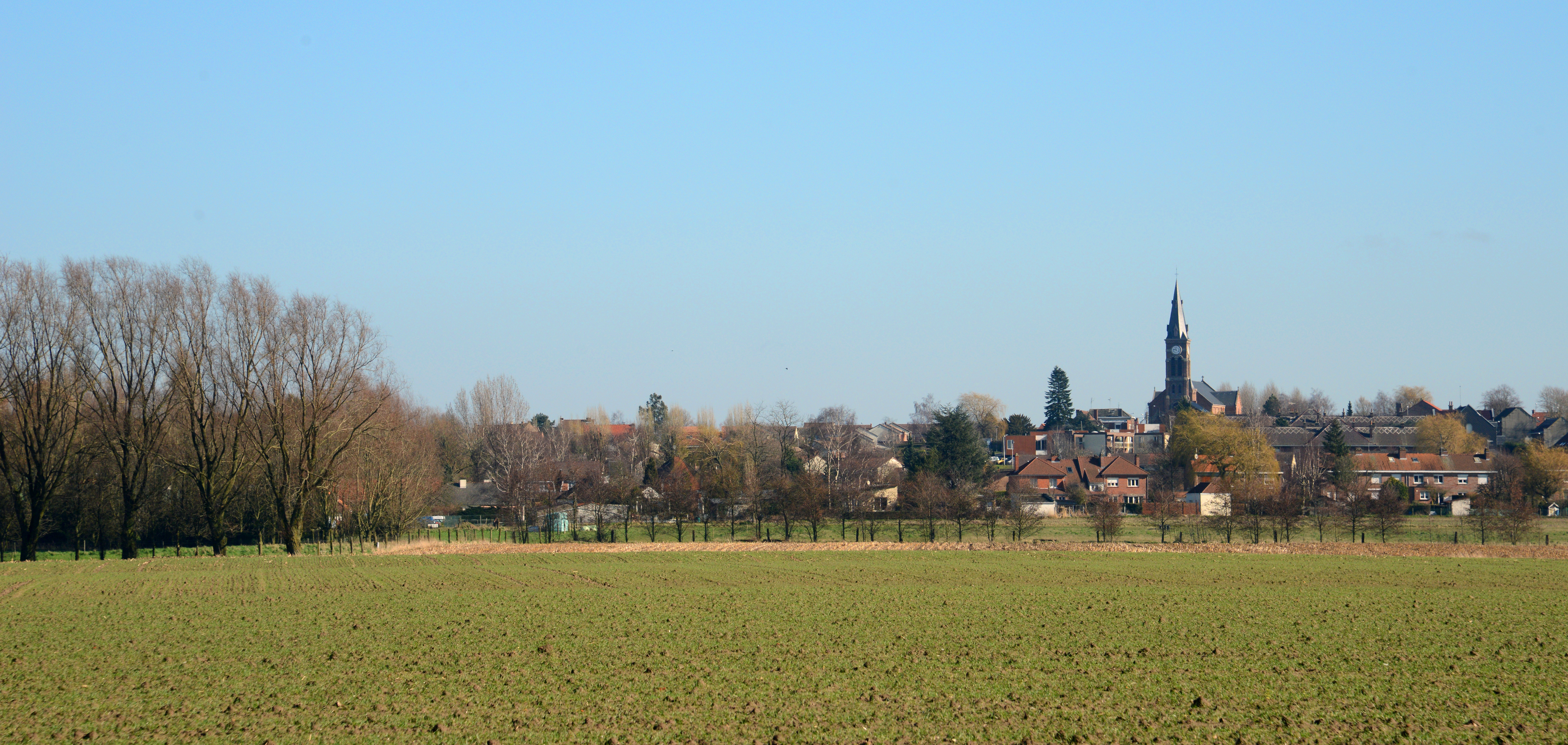
- Mont d'Halluin, highest point of the Ferrain

- Coat of arms

- Map of the Ferrain (dark green) in the historical Castellania of Lille (light green)
- Country: France
- Region: Hauts-de-France
- Département: Nord
- Main communes: Tourcoing, Roubaix, Wattrelos, Marcq-en-Barœul (Today); Comines, Roubaix, Tourcoing, Lannoy (Historical)

Area
  - Total: 272.4 km^{2} (105.2 sq mi)
- Elevation: 62 m (203 ft)

Population (2023)
  - Total: 512,036
  - Density: 1,880/km^{2} (4,868/sq mi)

The Ferrain or Pays de Ferrain (French pronunciation: [fe.ʁɛ̃], Picard: Païs d'Ferrain) is a natural and historical region of French Flanders.

== Etymology ==
The use of the name Ferrain is attested as early as the 14th century.

== Geography ==
The region extends as a crescent shape running along the border with Belgium and starting from the Lys river in Halluin, Bousbecque and Comines and stopping at Lannoy, in the Southwest.

The Ferrain is a part of the North European Plain and is characterized by a low relief caused by outliers. The height reaches 62 metres (203 ft) in Halluin. Its geology is composed of sand and clay.

It borders the Mélantois, Pévèle, Barœul and Valley of the Lys regions.

It is composed of the communes of Baisieux, Bondues, Bousbecque, Comines, Croix, Deûlémont, Forest-sur-Marque, Halluin, Hem, Lannoy, Leers Linselles, Lys-lez-Lannoy, Marcq-en-Barœul, Marquette-lez-Lille, Mouvaux, Neuville-en-Ferrain, Quesnoy-sur-Deûle, Roncq, Roubaix, Sailly-lez-Lannoy, Toufflers, Tourcoing, Wambrechies, Warneton, Wasquehal, Wattrelos, Wervicq-Sud, Willems

== History ==
During the Middle-Ages, the Ferrain was a district of the castellania of Lille, one of the 20 baronies of the County of Flanders.

== Culture ==
=== Language ===
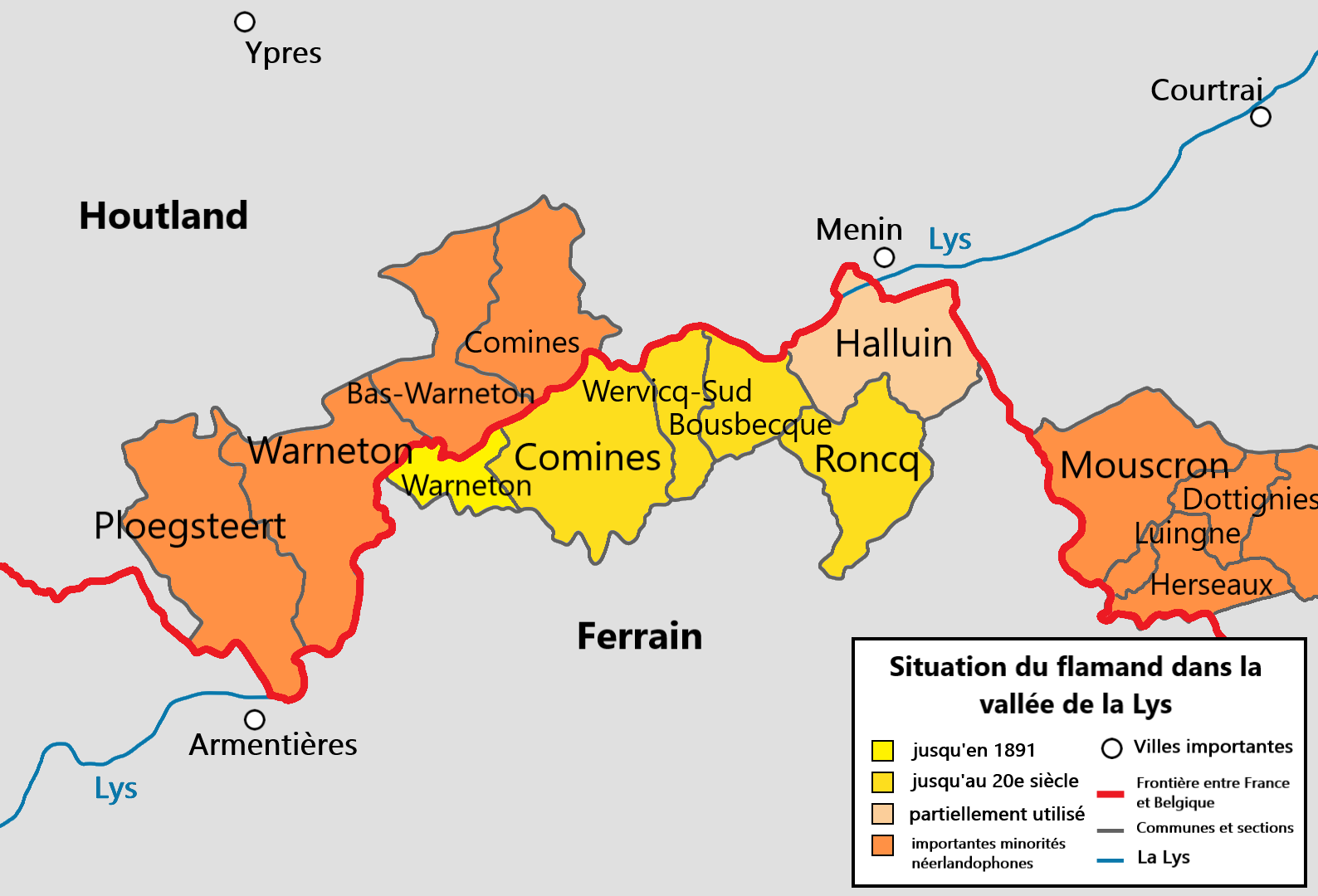
Flemish in the Valley of the Lys

During the 19th century, the Flemish language was spoken in communes south of the Lys river in Warneton, Wervicq, Halluin and Roncq. In the circum-lillois, conferences were held in Flemish in the communes of Armentières, Croix, Roubaix and Tourcoing. The language was still used popularly after 1891 in masses at Roncq.

Despite not being the popular languages of the Ferrain, Flemish remained a language spoken by the working class until the 20th century.
