= Plaine de la Lys =

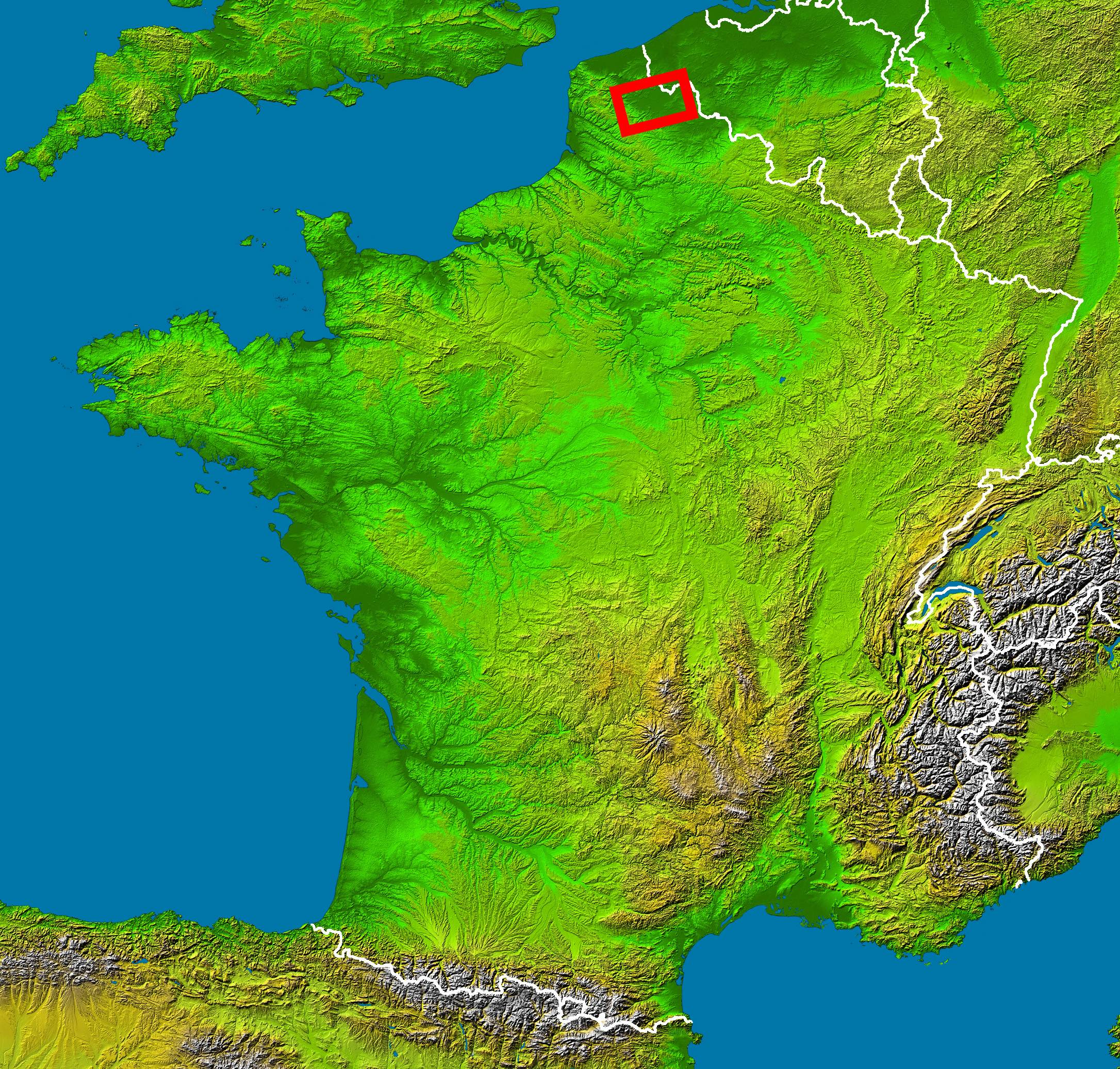
Plaine de la Lys on a map

The Plaine de la Lys is a particularly large alluvial section of the Valley of the Lys (Leiedal in Dutch).

It constitutes a natural region in northern France located at about twenty meters above sea level, in the northern and western parts of the territory of the urban community of Lille (on the French side), in biogeographical continuity with the Deûle Valley, although both waterways have been heavily modified (canalized, straightened, and degraded by a highly urbanized context and affected by significant industrial and intensive agriculture legacies).

== History ==
Under the Ancien Régime, the southwest of the plain was part of the County of Artois, while the north and east were part of the County of Flanders.

It is an area with a particularly turbulent history. The valley has repeatedly served as an invasion corridor and a battleground. It was also the scene of significant confrontations during the two World Wars. The aftermath of these wars is still evident in the landscape, particularly with the military cemeteries.

=== Economic Activity in the 18th and 19th centuries ===
Before the territorial demarcation established by the Treaties of Utrecht, the two banks formed a socio-economically coherent whole. Since then, this demarcation has constituted an obstacle between two regions that were previously closely linked by their activities.

Many shipments of grains and manufactured goods favored waterways over land routes, and there was a connection to Lille via the Deûle. For example, from 1 June 1785 to 17 February 1787, the count of passages under the Comines bridge was 1,819 large vessels and 71 small ones. This traffic persisted during the French Revolution and continued for part of the XIX

The primary economic activity was cereal cultivation, more specifically that of wheat. The fertility of the silty soil allowed for intensive farming techniques. In addition to cereal crops, industrial crops such as rapeseed for its oil and cultivated flax to supply the local textile industry were grown. The establishment of ribbon production in Comines by Philippe Hovyn as early as 1719 gradually eclipsed other activities in the valley, with the exception of breweries, which then concentrated in the textile domain.

== Geography ==
It is a transboundary area that is partially part of the Westhoek and French Flanders. Its richness in very fertile silt explains the omnipresence of agriculture and the scarcity of forests. The meadows remained abundant for a long time due to the alluvial and flood-prone nature of part of the plain, but the embankment of the Lys and improvements in drainage have led to a significant decline in grasslands since the 1960s.

== Ecology ==
The Lys Valley, as a former biological corridor to be restored under the Water Framework Directive and the Pan-European Ecological Network, and as an effective corridor for bird migration, is an important element of the regional green and blue infrastructure and the transboundary Pan-European Ecological Network.

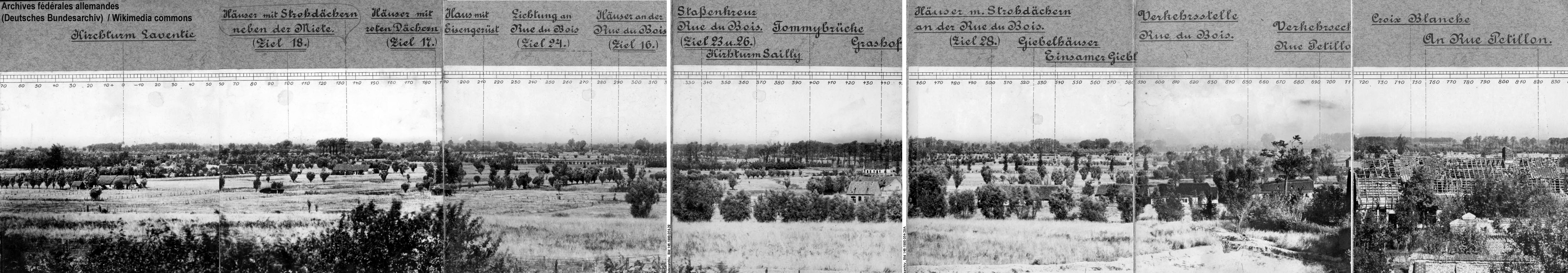
Graded panoramic produced at the beginning of the First World War to guide the firing of German artillery. This photo shows that about a century ago, the plain, prone to flooding, was still almost exclusively covered by meadows, hayfields, ponds, and wetlands, with a semi-hedgerow structure interspersed with cultivated plots, where a network of white willows trimmed in a tadpole shape along the drainage ditches and maintained field elms pruned for pollarding dominated. Thatched roofs were still very common

== Municipalities ==
The region comprises the plain or valley of the Lys river, which has been heavily urbanized since the First World War. The towns and villages of the plain extend, from Kortrijk in Belgium:

- Bissegem
- Marke
- Wevelgem
- Lauwe
- Menin
- Halluin
- Bousbecque
- Linselles
- Wervik
- Wervicq-Sud
- Comines (Belgium)
- Warneton-Bas
- Deûlémont
- Frelinghien
- Houplines
- Nieppe
- Armentières
- Erquinghem-Lys
- Sailly-sur-la-Lys
- Estaires
- La Gorgue
- Calonne-sur-la-Lys
- Saint-Floris
- Saint-Venant
- Haverskerque
- Thiennes
- Aire-sur-la-Lys
