= Menen =

- City and municipality
- Flag Coat of arms

- Location of Menen in West-Flanders
- Interactive map of Menen
- Location in Belgium
- Coordinates: 50°48′N 03°07′E
- Country: Belgium
- Community: Flemish Community
- Region: Flemish Region
- Province: West Flanders
- Arrondissement: Kortrijk

Government
  - Mayor: Kasper Vandecasteele (Vooruit)
  - Governing parties: Voor8930, CD&V,

Area
  - Total: 33.16 km^{2} (12.80 sq mi)

Population (2022-01-01)
  - Total: 33,982
  - Density: 1,025/km^{2} (2,654/sq mi)
- Postal codes: 8930
- NIS code: 34027
- Area codes: 056
- Website: www.menen.be

Menen (Dutch pronunciation: [ˈmeːnə(n)]; French: Menin [mənɛ̃]; West Flemish: Mêenn [ˈmeːnən] or Mêende [ˈmeːndə]) is a city and municipality located in the Belgian province of West Flanders. The municipality comprises the city of Menen proper and the towns of Lauwe and Rekkem. The city is situated on the French/Belgian border. On January 1, 2006, Menen had a total population of 32,413. The total area is 33.07 km^{2} which gives a population density of 980 inhabitants per km^{2}.

The city of Menen gives its name to the Menin Gate in Ypres, which is a monument to those killed in World War I. The gate is so called as the road from that gate is the road to Menen.

The town hall of Menen, with its large belfry, was inscribed on the UNESCO World Heritage List in 1999 as part of the Belfries of Belgium and France site, because of its civic importance and architecture.

== History ==
Menen's position near the French border led to many sieges in the history of the city. There were as many as 22 sieges between 1579 and 1830.

The city was part of France between 1668 and 1713. Vauban turned Menen into a model-fortification (1679–1689).

The city was besieged and taken by the Duke of Marlborough's allied Army in August 1706. Between 1744 and 1748, it was again under French rule after the Siege of Menin (1744). There was a devastating fire in 1750, that almost completely destroyed the city. During the Flanders Campaign of the Wars of the French Revolution the city changed hands several times. It was also the scene of a battle in September 1793.

Menen was a barrier town for the Dutch Republic against France from 1715 to 1781.

In 2013, the city drew international attention by forbidding its civil servants to speak French with francophones. The mayor, Martine Fournier, ordered that, if necessary, the communication should be in sign language.

== Culture ==
A new art museum, the Stadsmuseum ’t Schippershof, opened in 1999, holds many works by Menen-born sculptor Yvonne Serruys. Opposite 't Schippershof there is the cultural center CC De Steiger that houses the city's theater, public library and a concert space for live music.

== Gallery ==
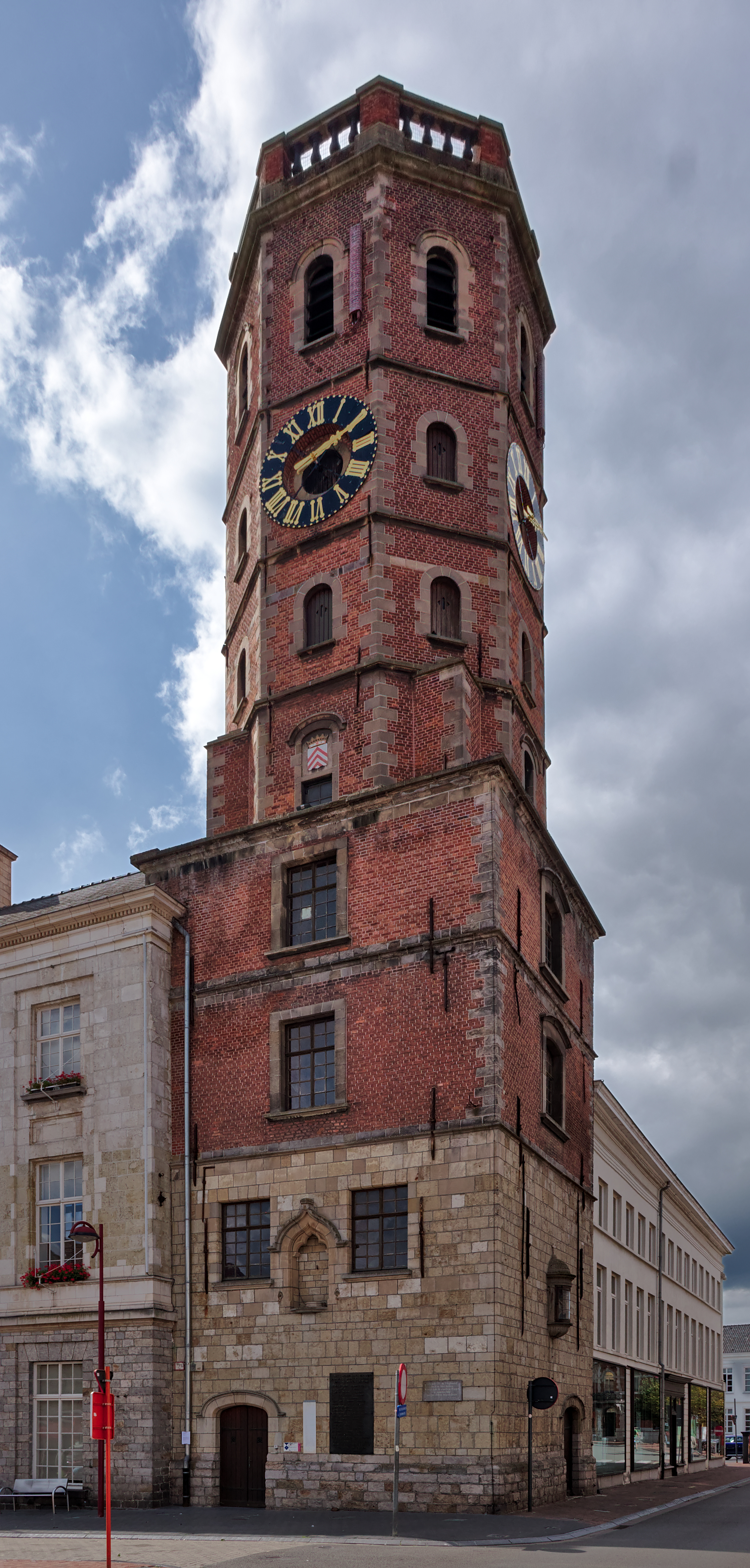
Belfry

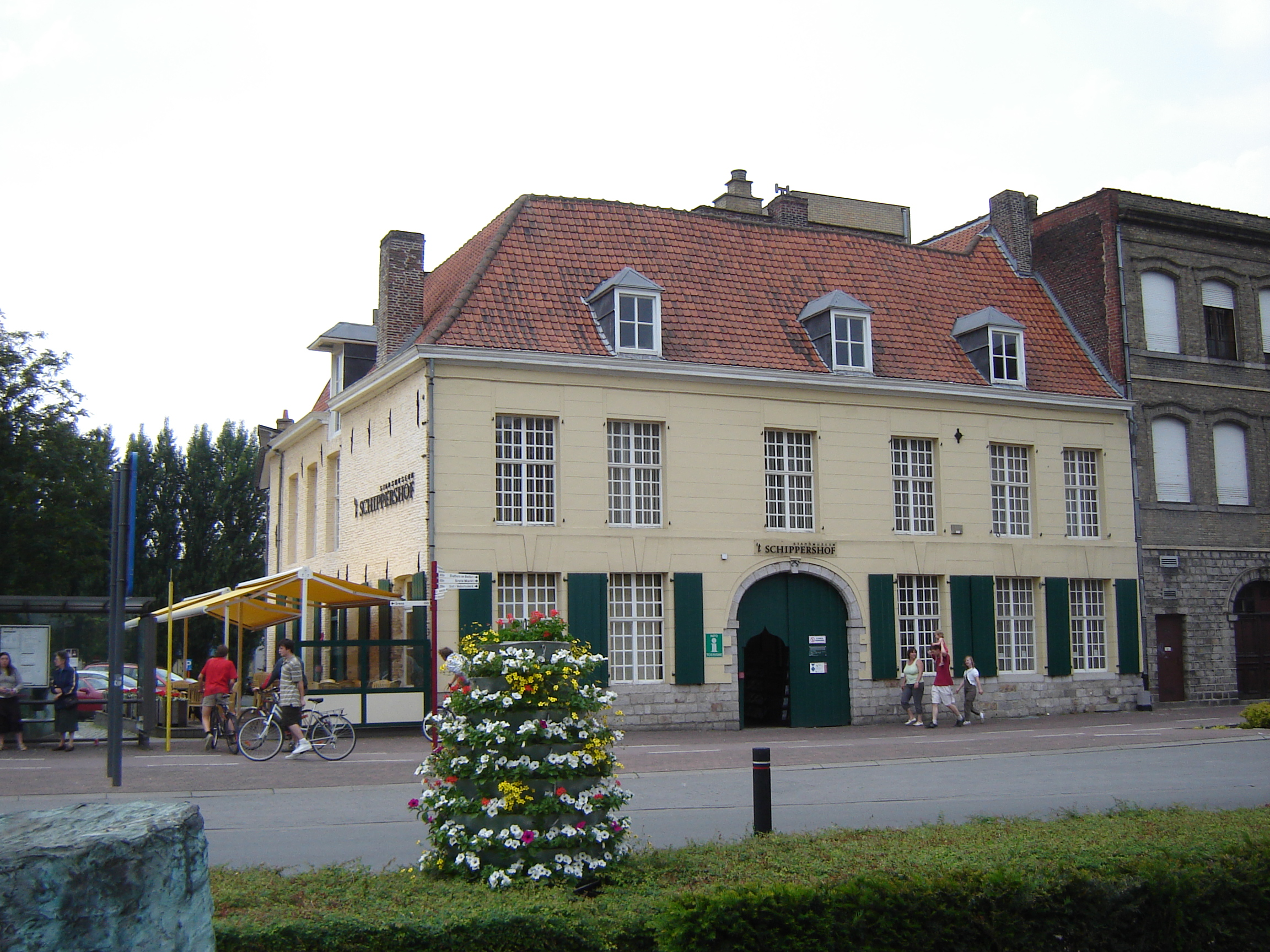
't Schippershof in Menen.

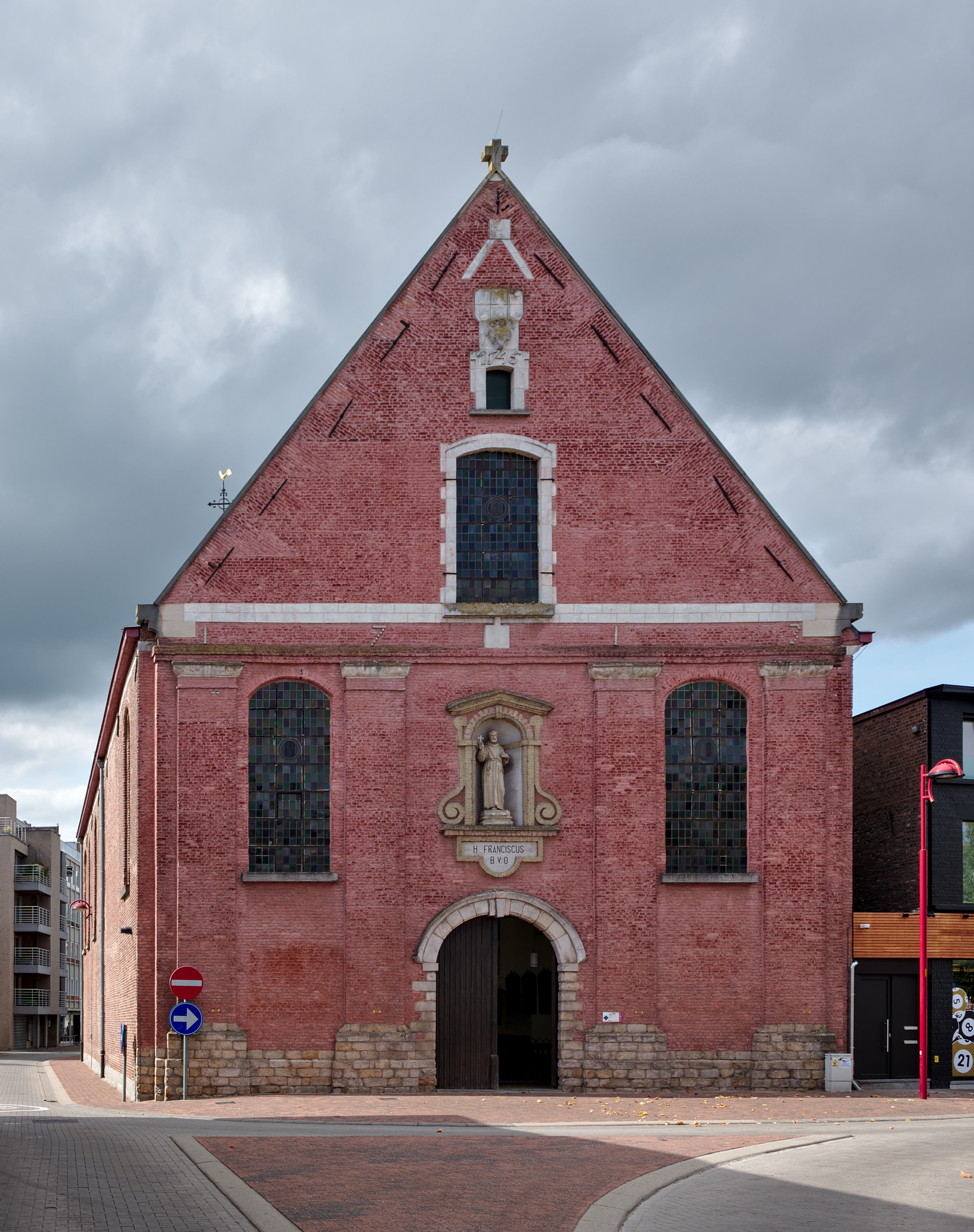
Sint-Franciscuskerk

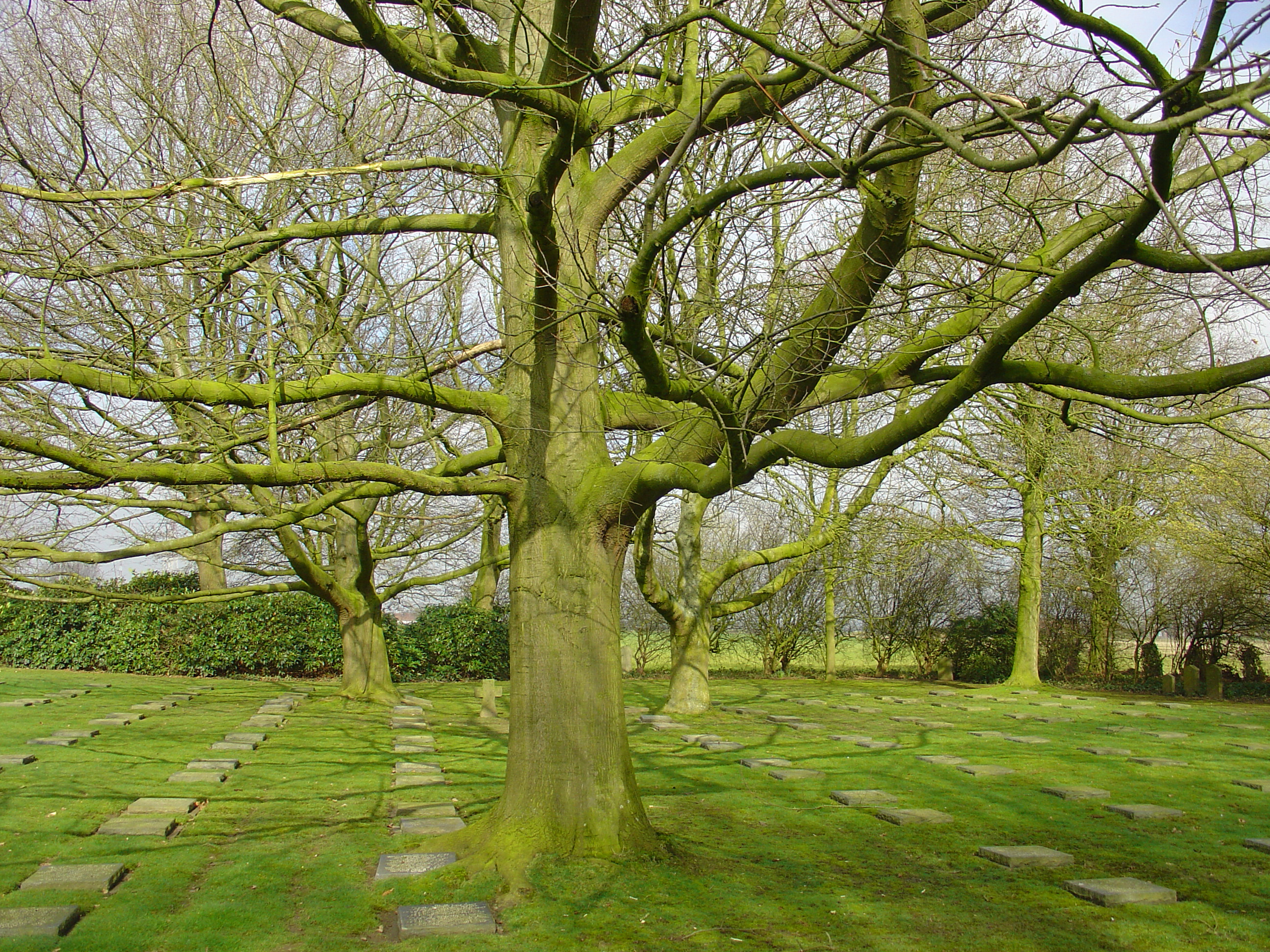
German World War I military cemetery

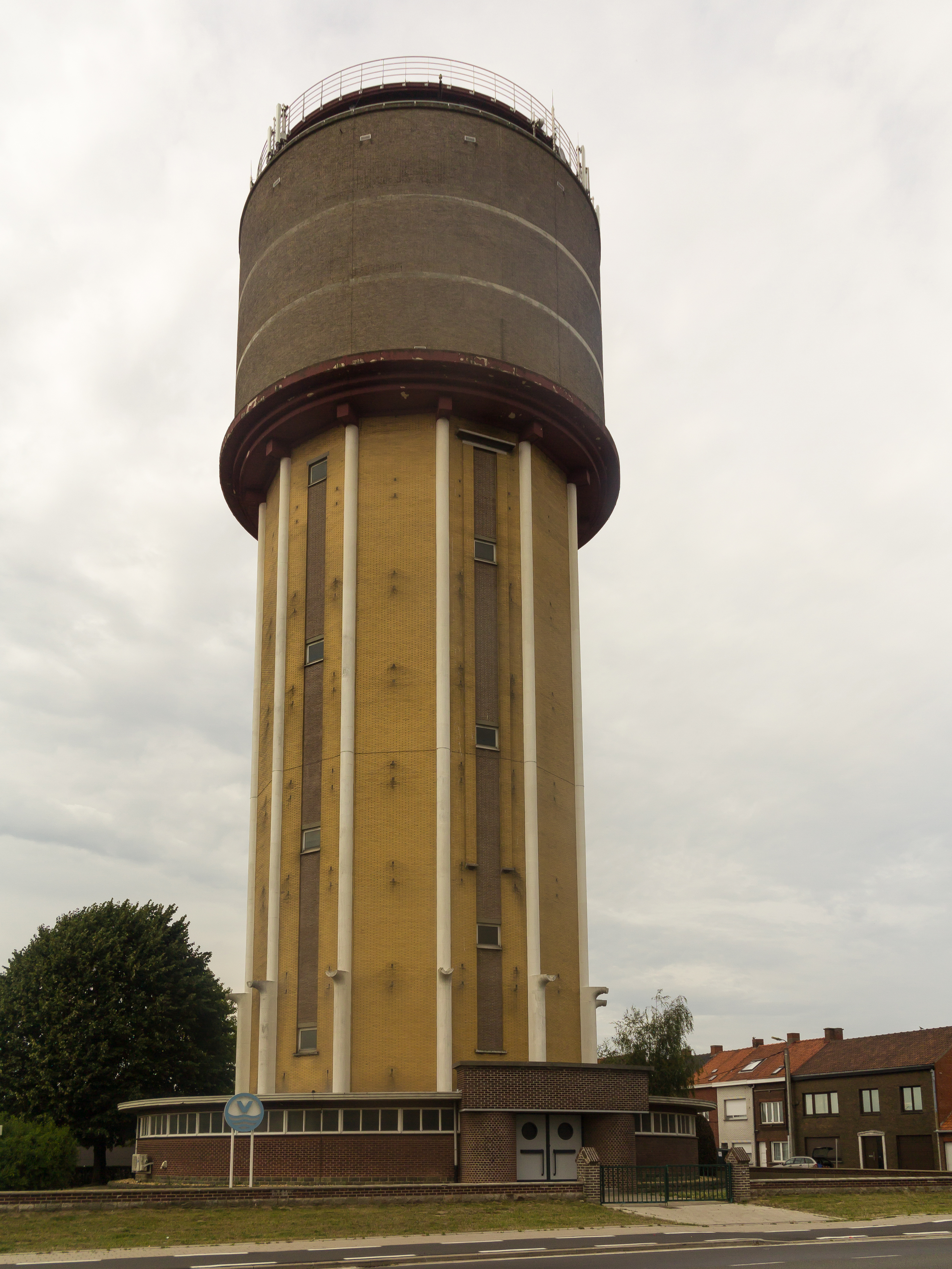
Watertower

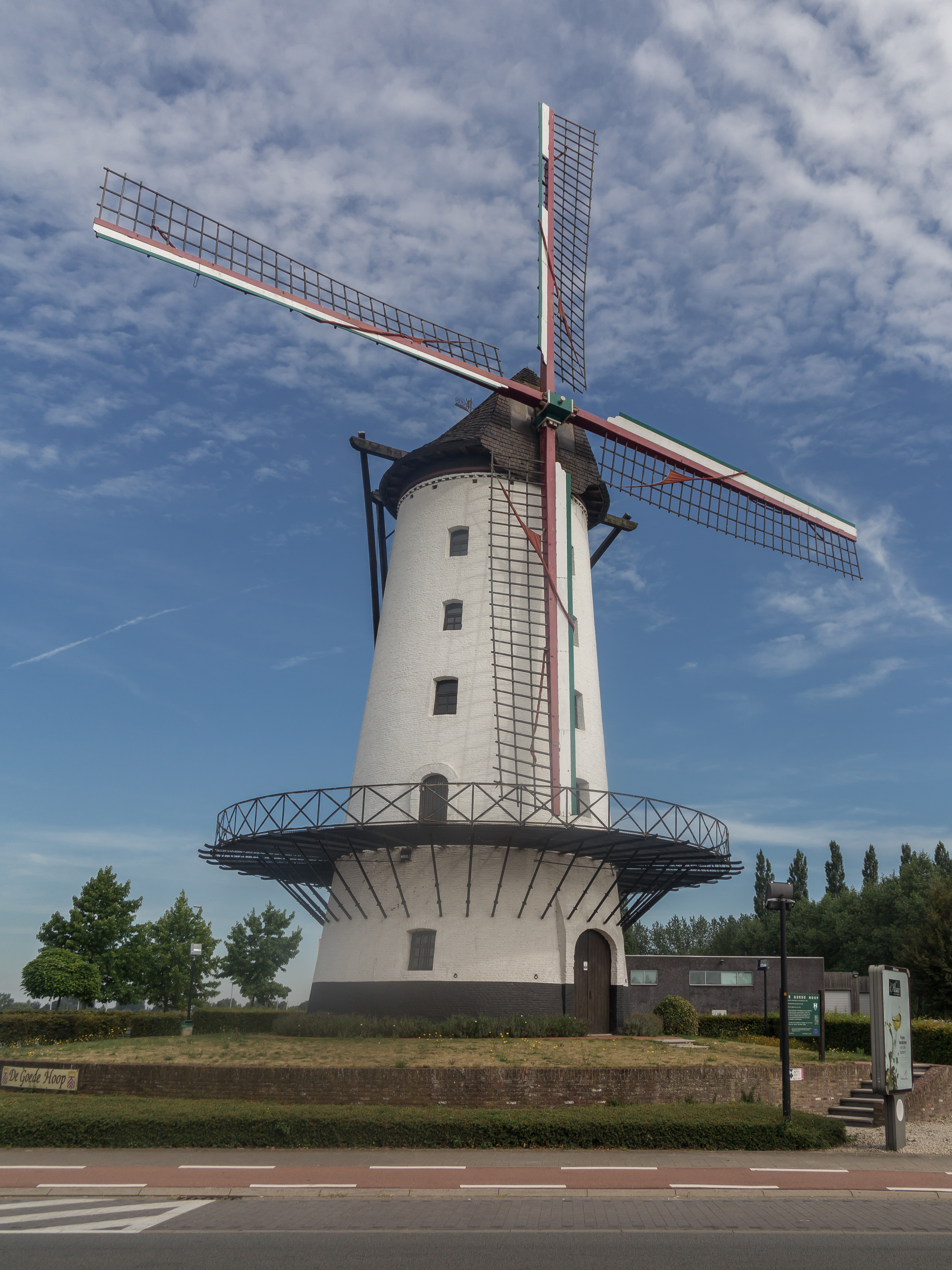
Windmill: molen de Goede Hoop

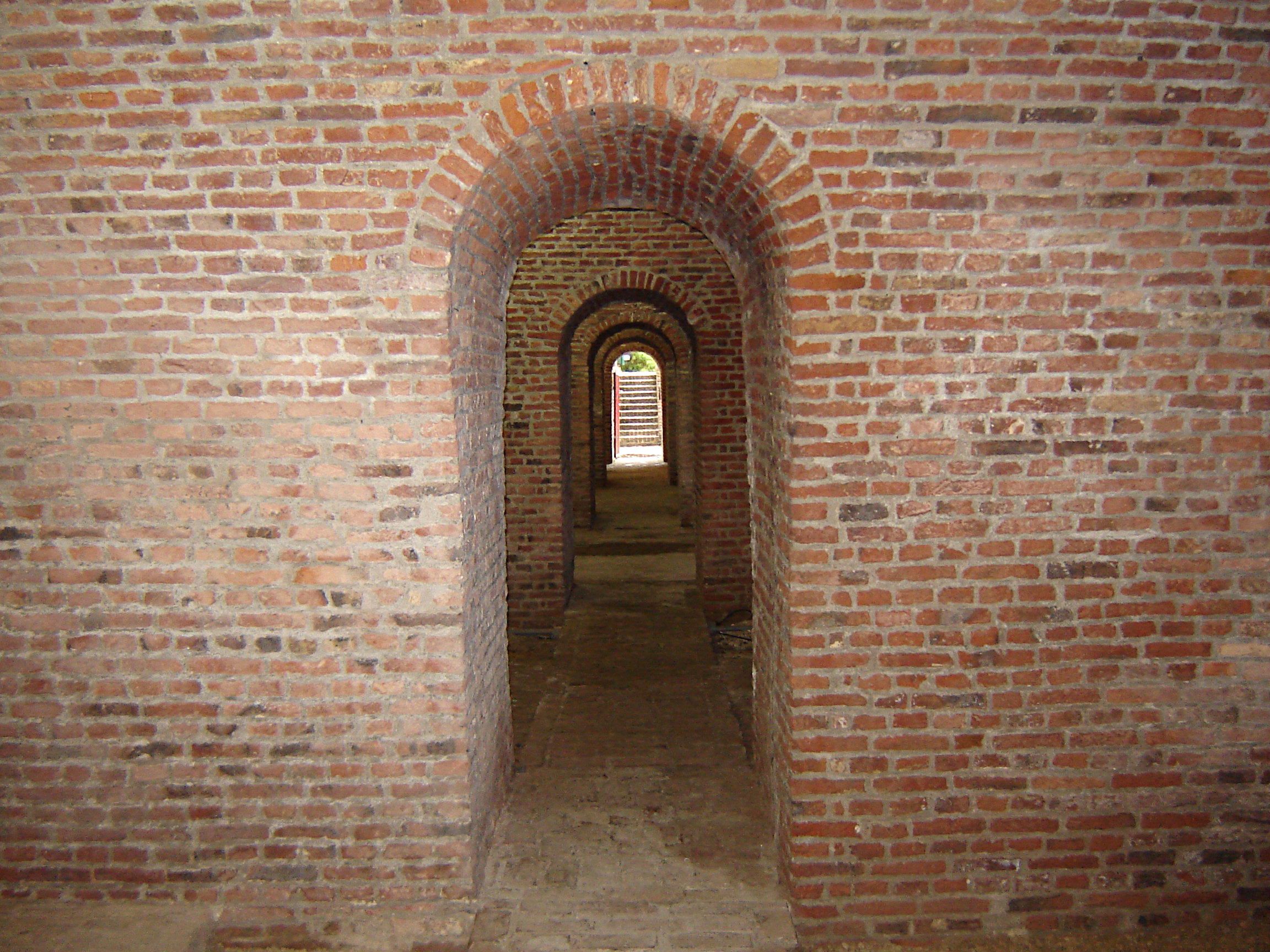
Menen casemates

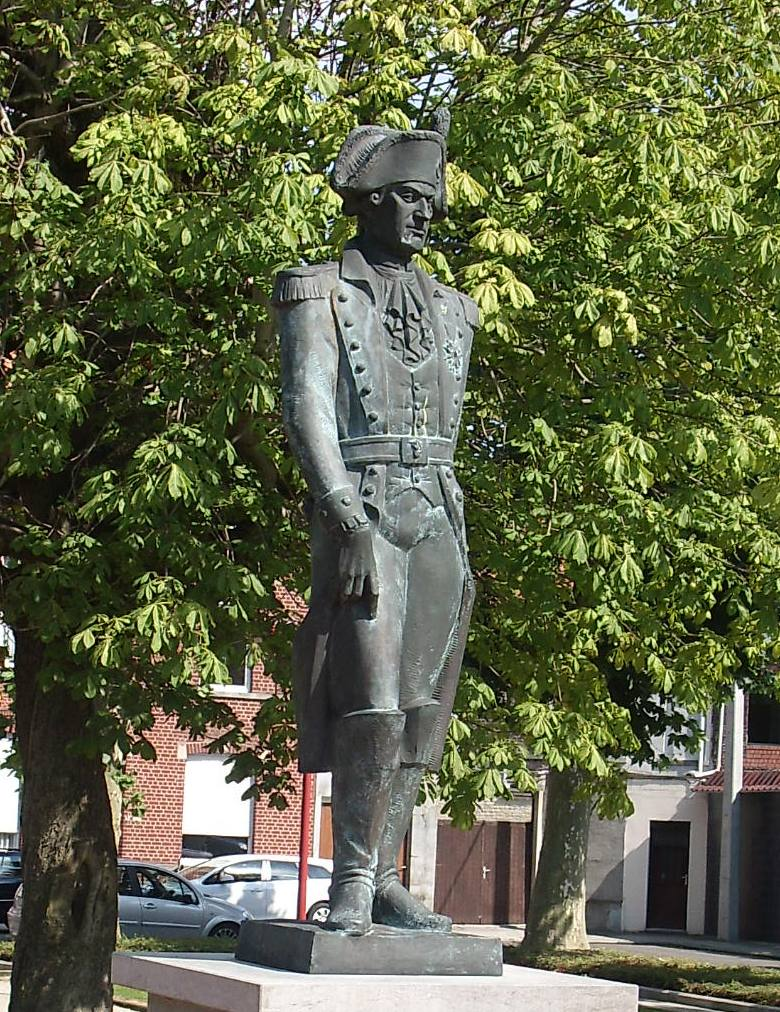
Statue of General Jean-André van der Mersch

== Towns ==
The municipality of Menen consists of Menen proper, Lauwe and Rekkem. In the area of Rekkem, there is also the hamlet of Paradijs (Rekkem), separated from Rekkem proper by the A14/E17. In addition to the central town, Menen proper also contains the parishes and districts of De Barakken and Ons Dorp. Menen proper is mainly located north of the Leie; Lauwe and Rekkem are located south of the river. The urban area of the city of Menen is directly connected with the urban area of the French municipality of Halluin.

#	Name	Area	Population (2006)
I (V) (VI)	Menen – Menen: De Barakken; – Ons Dorp	16,49	19.246
II	Lauwe	8,80	8.357
III (IV)	Rekkem – Rekkem – Paradijs	7,90	4.813

Menen, towns and neighbours. The yellow areas are urban areas.

The municipality of Menen borders the following villages:

- a. Moorsele (Wevelgem)
- b. Wevelgem (Wevelgem)
- c. Marke (Kortrijk)
- d. Aalbeke (Kortrijk)
- e. Mouscron (Wallonia)
- f. Neuville-en-Ferrain (France)
- g. Halluin (France)
- h. Wervik (Wervik)
- i. Geluwe (Wervik)

== Notable people from Menen ==
- Jonathan Breyne (born 1991), cyclist
- Yves Chauvin (1930–2015), French chemist, Nobel Prize winner 2005
- Françoise Chombar (born 1962), entrepreneur

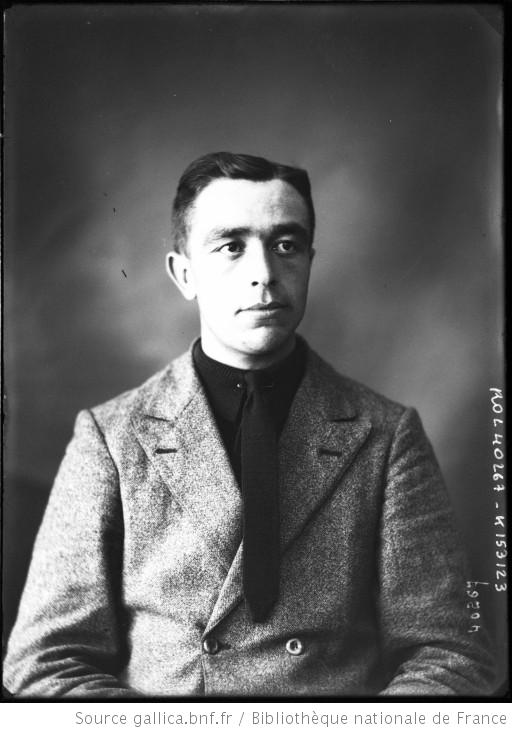
Paul Deman 1914

- Paul Deman (1889–1961), cyclist
- Bernard Lietaer, (1942–2019), economist, was born in Lauwe
- Jean-André van der Mersch (1734–1792), leader of the Brabant patriots in the Brabant Revolution in 1789
- Arthur Van Overberghe (born 1990), cyclist
- Yvonne Serruys (1873–1953), Franco-Belgian artist
- Gerard Vandenbussche (1902–1986) entrepreneur
- Louis Verhelst (born 1990), cyclist
- Albert Wauquier (born 1940), neurophysiologist, sleep medicine, writer
- Maurits Withouck (born 1928), sculptor

== Mayors ==
- 1921-1938: August Debunne (socialist)
- 1939-1942: Armand Deweerdt (liberal)
- 1944-1946: Armand Deweerdt (liberal)
- 1947-1964: René Gombert (liberal)
- 1964-1982: Paul Isebaert (N/D)
- 1983-1989: Fernand Dehaene (Christian Democrat)
- 1989-1994: Gilbert Bossuyt (Socialist)
- 1995-2000: Jean Libbrecht (liberal)
- 2001-2012: Gilbert Bossuyt (socialist)
  - 2003-2004: Karl Debuck (replacement mayor)
- 2013-2018: Martine Fournier (Christian Democrat)
- 2019-: Eddy Lust (liberal)

Political Parties	10-10-1976		10-10-1982		9-10-1988		9-10-1994		8-10-2000		8-10-2006		14-10-2012		14-10-2018		13-10-2024	
Votes/Chairs	%	31	%	31	%	31	%	31	%	31	%	31	%	31	%	31	%	31
Christian Democrats	38,39^{1}	13	30,18^{1}	10	28,03^{1}	10	26,21^{1}	9	24,11^{1}	8	21,99^{A}	**7**	23,86^{2}	**8**	29,4^{2}	10	20,8^{2}	**7**
New Flemish Alliance (Flemish Nationalists)	14,83^{1}	4	16,04^{1}	5	10,19^{1}	2	-		-		21,99^{A}	**7**	17,25^{2}	**6**	12,6^{2}	**4**	22,1^{2}	7
Open Flemish Liberals and Democrats	10,59^{1}	3	13,76^{1}	4	17,05^{1}	5	17,7^{2}	6	22,24^{2}	**7**	19,08^{2}	6	16,01^{3}	**5**	18,1^{3}	**6**	32,0^{D}	**11**
Vooruit/SP.A (Socialist Party)	33,85^{1}	11	33,81^{1}	12	37,98^{1}	13	31,15^{1}	11	32,95^{1}	**12**	32,24^{B}	**12**	24,26^{C}	8	17,2^{2}	**6**	32,0^{D}	**11**
Greens	-		-		5,98^{1}	1	6,08^{1}	1	-		4,82^{2}	0	24,26^{C}	8	9,2^{3}	2	6,8^{3}	1
Flemish Interest (Flemish separatists)	-		-		-		5,48^{1}	1	7,53^{1}	2	12,51^{2}	4	5,92^{2}	1	10,2^{2}	3	16,9^{2}	5
Party of the labourers (Marxists)	0,77^{1}	0	0,62^{1}	0	0,76^{2}	0	0,99^{1}	0	-		-		-		3,2^{1}	0	-	
Open City Menen	-		-		-		-		-		-		7,37	2	-		-	
New	-		-		-		-		-		9,37	2	5,33	1	-		-	
VIA	-		-		-		-		5,37	1	-		-		-		-	
GEBE	-		-		-		11,57	3	5,28	1	-		-		-		-	
Other Political Parties^{(*)}	1,57	0	5,59	0	-		0,82	0	2,51	0	-		-		-		1,4	0
Total Votes	23750		23079		23009		22605		22327		22918		22314		22326		13261	
attendance (in%)					94,26		93,12		92,62		94,08		91,94		93,4		56,0	
blank/invalid (in%)	5,2		5,91		6,08		6,79		6,29		5,62		6,59		6,2		2,5	

The Chairs of the majority coalition are written in Bold: 2018 = New Flemish Alliance: 4, Open Flemish Liberals and Democrats: 6, SP.A/Greens: 8
