= Spiere Castle =

Castle in Spiere-Helkijn, Belgium

Coordinates: 51.275°N 3.293°E

- Belgium
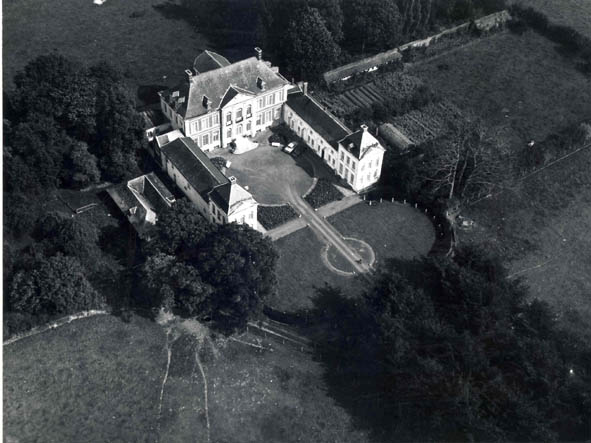

Site information
- Type: Castle

Spiere Castle is a castle in Spiere, Belgium. The current castle was built in the mid-18th century and was the seat of the Barony of Spiere.

== History ==
The estate was home to the seat of the Lords of Spiere, in the form of a motte-and-bailey castle whose history dates back to the 12th century. This was later expanded into a fortified castle.

In 1351 the castle was destroyed by the people of Kortrijk. In 1477, the castle was destroyed again by the French during their war against Mary of Burgundy. Remains of the motte, named La Cave aux Diables, are still present, particularly the cellar made of Tournai limestone, a silver-grey limestone mined near Tournai.

== Building ==
The castle is approached via a cobbled driveway, along which stands a Neo-Gothic chapel from the last quarter of the 19th century. The castle has a U-shaped floor plan. The wings enclose a courtyard. The building is symmetrical in design. It is nine bays wide, of which the central projection is three bays wide and constructed of Tournai stone. It has two stories and is covered by a hipped roof. The central projection is crowned by a triangular pediment bearing the alliance coat of arms of the del Fosse and de Sourdeau families.

The side wings are one story high and are each topped by a small two-story building.

There is a landscape garden from the early 18th century.

== See also ==
- List of castles in Belgium
