= Flag of Menen =

Menen

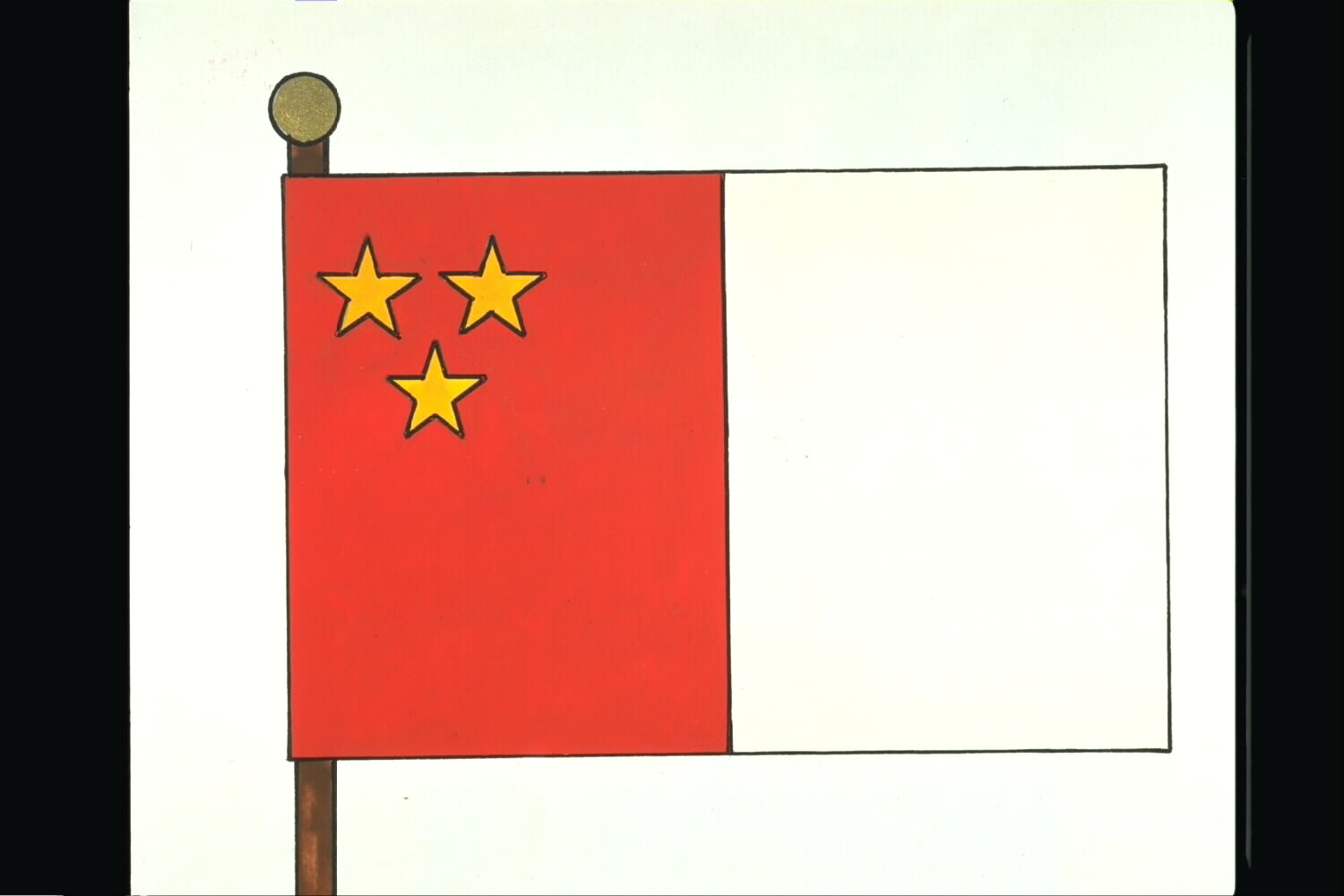
Official drawing of the flag

The Flag of Menen, a city in the Belgian province of West-Flanders, resembles the rich cultural and heraldic history of the municipality.

== Symbolism ==
The flag consists of Two equally long stripes of red and white, with three yellow five-pointed stars in the top of the trousers, placed 2 and 1, the colors refer to the historic arms of the city, during the Middle Ages. And the 3 yellow stars refer to the 3 sub-municipalities of Menen (Menen, Lauwe, and Rekkem)

=== Description ===
Officially the flag is described as:

Twee even lange banen van rood en van wit, met in de broektop drie gele vijfpuntige sterren, geplaatst 2 en 1
(English: Two equally long stripes of red and white, with three yellow five-pointed stars in the top of the trousers, placed 2 and 1)

== History ==
The flag was officially adopted by the municipal council on April 25 1980, then confirmed by the Royal order on October 1 of the same year.

In 1977, Menen merged with the sub-municipalities of Lauwe and Rekkem. The official municipal flag was only established by the municipal council 3 years after the merge.

== See also ==
- Coat of arms of Menen
