= Geluwe =

Town in the West Flemish province of Belgium

Coordinates: 50.810721°N 3.077446°E

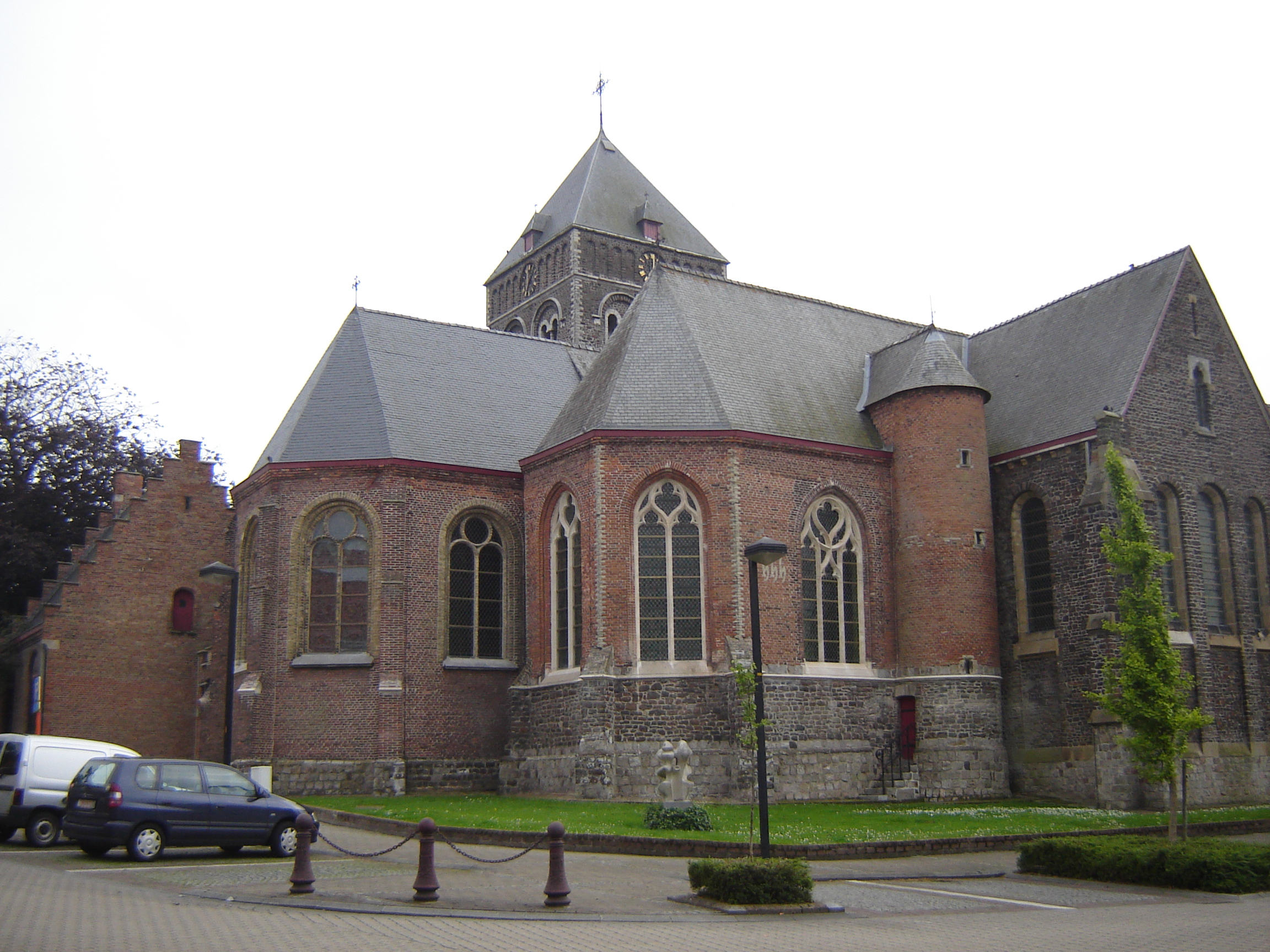
Sint-Dionysiuskerk

Geluwe (Hilwe in West Flemish) is a town in the West Flemish province of Belgium. It is contained within the municipality of Wervik. The town is known for the "yawning festival" (Dutch: gapersfeesten). The name Geluwe comes from the word gilwe, old West Flemish for yellow, because the soil is more yellow than the rest of the region.

== Geography ==
The town counts 6,668 habitats and an area of 21.09 km^{2} (8.14 sq mi). The neighboring towns and cities are:

- Beselare (municipality Zonnebeke)
- Dadizele (municipality Moorslede)
- Moorsele (municipality Wevelgem)
- Menen
- Wervik (mayor municipality)
- Kruiseke (municipality Wervik)

Through the town the stream Reutelbeek flows.

== Transport ==
Geluwe is accessible by bus line 84 of the public transport company De Lijn. This bus line also stops in Ypres, Menin, Rekkem and Mouscron.

There's also an exit of the A19 (motorway) for cars. This makes transportation to Ypres and Courtrai quick and easy.

The N8 road is a road that makes it possible to go to Ypres and Menin. There's a bicycle path besides it.
