= Hôtel de Ville, Halluin =

Town hall in Halluin, France

Hôtel de Ville
- The main frontage of the Hôtel de Ville in July 2023

General information
- Type: City hall
- Architectural style: Neoclassical style
- Location: Halluin, France
- Coordinates: 50.7827°N 3.1246°E
- Completed: c.1890

The Hôtel de Ville (French pronunciation: [otɛl də vil], City Hall) is a municipal building in Halluin, Nord, in northern France, standing on Rue Marthe Nollet.

== History ==
Following the French Revolution, the new town council established its first town hall in a building on Rue Abbé Bonpain. The building had been designed in the neoclassical style, built in ashlar stone and had been completed in 1722. The design involved a symmetrical main frontage of seven bays facing onto the street. The central bay featured a wide opening with voussoirs and a keystone leading to a courtyard behind. There was a French door with a balcony on the first floor, while the rest of the building was fenestrated by casement windows with moulded surrounds. After the building was no longer required for municipal use, it was converted for commercial use and survived until it was demolished in 1989.

By the end of the Second World War, the building on Rue Abbé Bonpain was quite delapidated and the council moved to their second town hall at No. 103 Rue de Lille. The building was designed in the neoclassical style and built in red brick with stone finishings. The design involved an asymmetrical main frontage of seven bays facing onto Rue de Lille. The right-hand bay featured a segmental headed doorway with a fanlight, a moulded surround and a keystone. There was a French door with a balcony on the first floor, while the rest of the building was fenestrated by casement windows with stone surrounds. After the building was no longer required for use as the town hall, it continued to accommodate the tax department of the council until March 2025, when it became the Maison de l'entrepreneuriat (business hub).

In 1970, after significant population growth, the council led by the mayor, Charles Vanoverschelde, decided to acquire a more substantial property. The building they selected was the Château Sion on what is now Rue Marthe Nollet. The building had been commissioned by the Demeestère family in around 1890. Pierre Demeestère and, his son-in-law, Edouard Lemaitre, had developed a factory making linen fabric using bleached, machine-spun yarns imported from England in around 1830. After Pierre died in 1887, the business was inherited by his son, Edmond. The building was designed in the neoclassical style and built in red brick with stone finishings and was probably completed around then. The originally design involved a gabled main frontage of just two bays facing onto the street.

After Edmond died in 1924, the house was acquired by the Sion family, who owned a textile weaving mill on Rue Pasteur. The building was extensively remodelled by the Sion family and, after it had been acquired by the council in 1970, it was refurbished and a new Salle des Mariages (wedding room) was created. Following completion of the works the council moved in on 25 March 1974.

On the night of 29 June 2023, during the Nahel Merzouk riots, the town hall was attacked by a group of individuals who broke the windows and threw firebombs into the wedding room, which was badly damaged in the ensuing fire.
