= Congress of Aix-la-Chapelle (1748) =

1748 congress to conclude the War of Austrian Succession

The Congress of Aachen (French: Congress of Aix-la-Chapelle) was assembled on 24 April 1748 in the Free Imperial City of Aachen, in the west of the Holy Roman Empire, to conclude the struggle known as the War of Austrian Succession. Between 30 April and 21 May the preliminaries were agreed to between Great Britain, France, the Dutch Republic, and Maria Theresa, queen of Bohemia and Hungary. Sardinia, Spain, the Modena, and the Republic of Genoa successively gave their adhesion. The definitive treaty was signed on the 18th of October, Sardinia alone refusing to accede, because the Treaty of Worms was not guaranteed.

== Treaty of Aix-la-Chapelle ==
Of the provisions of the treaty of Aix-la-Chapelle, the most important were those stipulating for:

1. a general restitution of conquests, including Cape Breton Island to France, Madras to Britain and the barrier towns to the Dutch
2. the assignment to Don Philip of the duchies of Parma and Piacenza and Guastalla
3. the restoration of Francesco III d'Este of Modena and the Republic of Genoa to their former positions
4. the renewal in favour of Great Britain of the Asiento contract of 16 March 1713, and of the right to send an annual vessel to the Spanish colonies
5. the renewal of the article of the treaty of 1718 recognizing the Protestant succession in the British throne
6. the recognition of the Emperor Francis I and the confirmation of the pragmatic sanction, i.e. of the right of Maria Theresa to the Habsburg succession
7. the guarantee to Prussia of the Duchies of Silesia and the County of Glatz.

== Changes to the treaty ==
Spain having raised objections to the Asiento clauses, the treaty of Aix-la-Chapelle was supplemented by the Treaty of Madrid on the 5th of October, 1750, by which Great Britain surrendered her claims under those clauses in return for a sum of £100,000.
