= Castellany of Lille =

Castellany of Lille Châtellenie de Lille (French) Catélenie d' Lille (Picard) Kasselry Rysel (West Flemish)
- 1039–1562
- Coat of arms

- Location of the Castellany of Lille in the County of Flanders

- Map of the Castellany of Lille, 1707
- Capital: Lille
- Common languages: French (official); Picard, Flemish
- Religion: Catholicism
- Demonym: Lillois
- Government: Monarchy
- Châtelain
  - 1039–1097: Saswallon
  - 1547–1562: Antoine of Navarre
- Historical era: Medieval
  - Established: 1039
  - Disestablished: 1562

Area
- 880 km^{2} (340 sq mi)
- Currency: Denarius
- Today part of: France

The Castellany of Lille is a Medieval barony of the county of Flanders.

== History ==
The Castellany had the Salle de Lille (or Castle of Lille) as its chef-lieu, seat of the feodal court of the count.

The Castellany is mentioned for the first time in 1039 and was divided into seven quartiers:

- Mélantois (chef-lieu: Seclin)
- Weppes (chef-lieu: Wavrin)
- Pévèle (chef-lieu: Orchies)
- Ferrain (chef-lieu: Comines)
- Carembault (chef-lieu: Phalempin)
- Outre-Escault
- Comté

The original castle was the castle of Plouich at Phalempin. The necropolis of the châtelains was located in the Saint-Christophe abbey, in the same city. It was founded by Saswallon, first châtelain of Lille, in 1039.

== Châtelains ==
- Saswallon, first châtelain (1039–1097)
- Gérard de Buc, second spouse of Saswallon's daughter. He is the Gérard who accompanied Robert I of Flanders in his pilgrimage to Jerusalem.
- Roger I, châtelain around 1098
  - Roger II († 1130)
    - Renaud I († 1133), he died without an heir. He possibly married Adelis of Guines, daughter of Arnould I of Guines, who married again before his death.
    - Robert I († 1136)
    - Roger III († 1146)
      - Robert II († 1147)
      - Renaud II († 1163)
      - Hugues († 1169), he began as a clergyman. After the death of his brother, he became châtelain of Lille. In 1177, he married Ermentrude.
        - Jean I († 1200)
          - Roger IV († 1230)
          - Guillaume († 1235), provost of Saint-Pierre
          - Elisabeth, who married to a châtelain of Péronne
            - Jean II († 1244)
              - Jean III († 1276),
                - Jean IV († 1276
                  - Jean IV († 1302)
- Marie of Luxembourg
- Antoine of Navarre, last châtelain of Lille (1547–1562) and grandson of Marie I
