= Mélantois =

Coordinates: 50.5833°N 3.0833°E

- Natural region
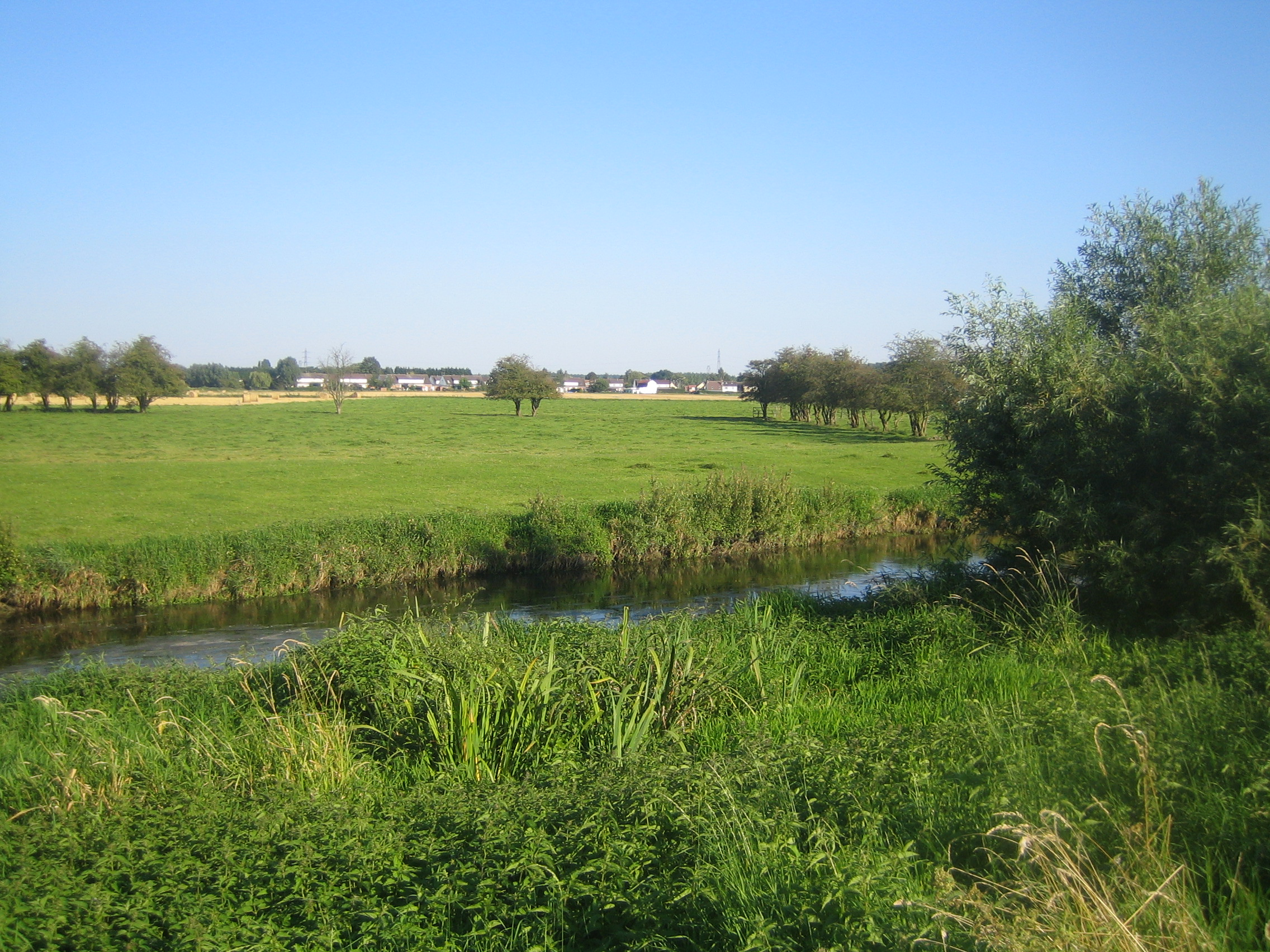
- The Marque river, Marcq-en-Barœul

- Coat of arms

- Map of the Mélantois (dark green) in the Castellania of Lille (light green)
- Country: France
- Region: Hauts-de-France
- Département: Nord
- Main communes: Lille, Villeneuve-d'Ascq, La Madeleine (Today); Lille, Seclin (Historical)
- Chef-lieu: Seclin

Area
  - Total: 180.71 km^{2} (69.77 sq mi)
- Elevation: 55 m (180 ft)

Population (2023)
  - Total: 492,795
  - Density: 2,727.0/km^{2} (7,062.9/sq mi)

The Mélantois (French pronunciation: [melɑ̃twa], Païs d'Mélantois) is an inland area of northern France, at south-east of Lille. Between the Deûle and the Marque, it is bounded to the north by a line from Willems to La Madeleine. It is a chalky plateau at an altitude of between 20 and 45 metres (66 and 148 ft), with gentle slopes (below 5 %).

== Etymology ==
The name Mélantois refers to its geographical position as it can be translated to "Milieu" (Middle).

== Geography ==
The region is located south of the Ferrain, west of the Pévèle, north of the Carembault and east of the Weppes.

== History ==
During Antiquity, the Mélantois was a pagus of the civitas of Medenentensis.
