= Canton of Tourcoing-1 =

Canton of France

Coordinates: 50.73°N 3.14°E

The canton of Tourcoing-1 is an administrative division of Nord, a department in northern France. It was created at the French canton reorganisation which came into effect in March 2015. Its seat is in Tourcoing.

It consists of the following communes:

- Halluin
- Neuville-en-Ferrain
- Roncq
- Tourcoing (partly)
