= Risquons-Tout =

- Village
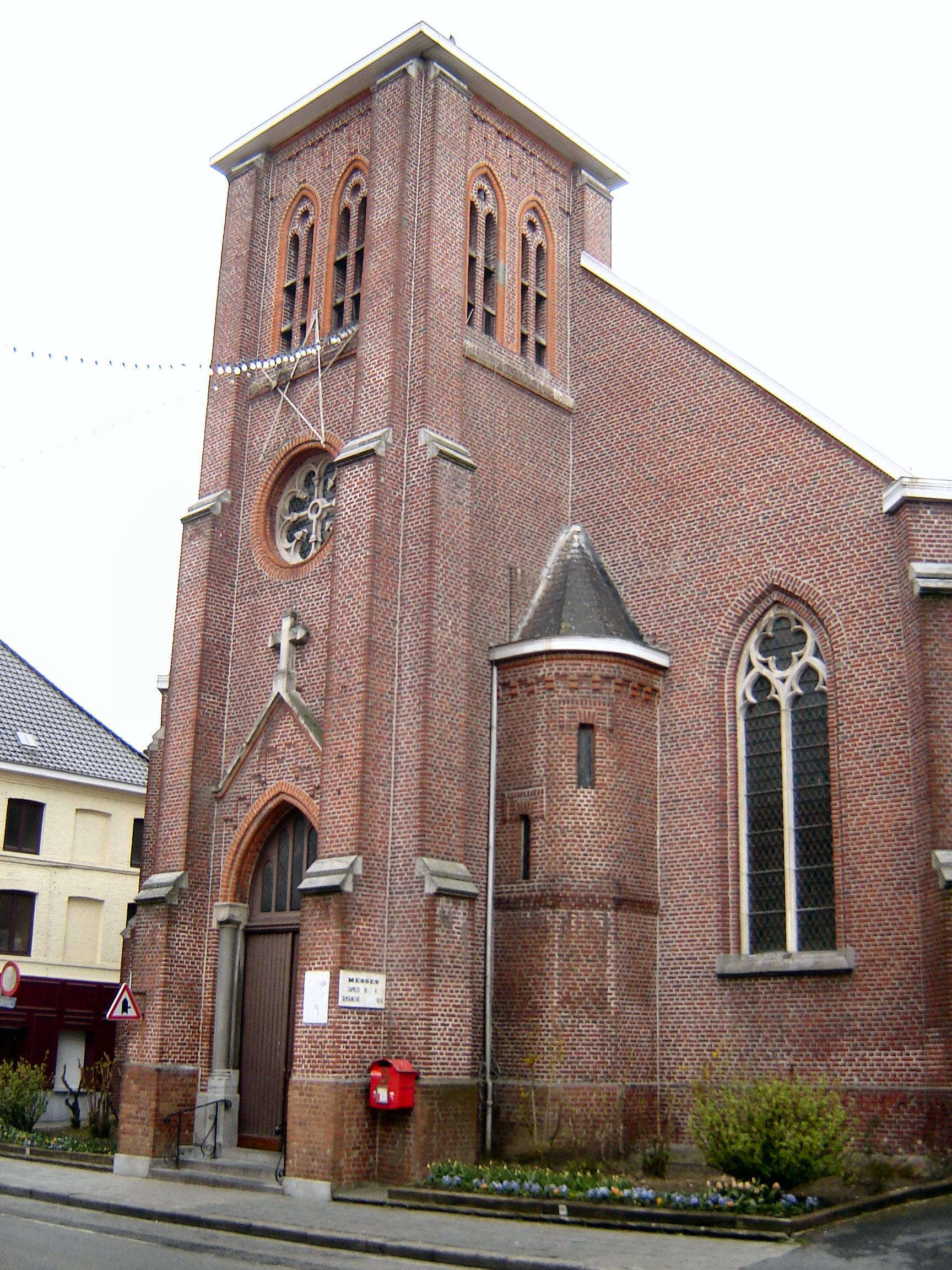
- The Church of Saint Paul in Risquons-Tout.

- Risquons-Tout in Belgium
- Coordinates: 50°45′10″N 3°11′16″E
- Country: Belgium
- Region: Wallonia
- Province: Hainaut
- Municipality: Mouscron

Risquons-Tout (French pronunciation: [ʁiskɔ̃ tu]) is a hamlet of Wallonia in the municipality and district of Mouscron, located in the province of Hainaut, Belgium on the border with France.

It is primarily known for the Risquons-Tout incident, in which a group of Belgian émigrés entered the country carrying arms in an attempt to overthrow the Belgian government during the Revolutions of 1848.

== Name ==
In French, Risquons-Tout literally means "Let's risk it all" or "Let's risk everything". The name derives from a sign for a bar (cabaret) that once occupied the site but which is no longer in existence.

== Location ==
The hamlet lies on a national border, immediately adjacent to Neuville-en-Ferrain and Tourcoing in France, and on a regional border, adjacent to Rekkem in Flanders. Risquons-Tout was once part of the municipality of Rekkem. In 1963, when the Belgian-language border was fixed, it was transferred to the city of Mouscron.

== Risquons-Tout incident ==
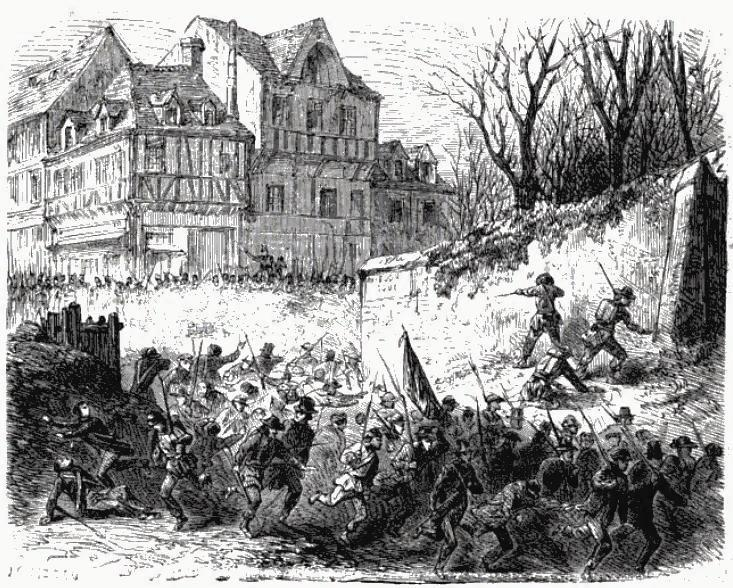
An 1865 illustration of the battle

Shortly after the French Revolution of 1848, Belgian migrant workers living in Paris were encouraged to return to Belgium to overthrow the monarchy and establish a republic. Around 6,000 émigrés, coming from Paris, formed a so-called Belgian Legion. The Legion, equipped with weaponry by some of the administrative authorities of Lille, intended to penetrate into Belgium to "raise the people" and overthrow the Belgian monarchy. It is likely that the revolutionaries had the support of Alphonse de Lamartine, Minister of Foreign Affairs of the French Second Republic, which had only recently been installed and was still very militant. The first group of revolutionaries attempted to travel into Belgium by train; they were stopped and quickly disarmed at Quiévrain on 26 March 1848.

The 2,000-strong second group entered Belgium at dawn on 29 March at Risquons-Tout. The revolutionaries were met by around 250 infantrymen of the Belgian Army under the command of General Joseph Fleury-Duray. A heavy cannonade routed the revolutionaries in only two hours, killing seven and wounding 26. 60 revolutionaries were captured and some were imprisoned in the Citadel of Huy, of whom 17 of them were condemned to death and executed at Antwerp.

Several smaller revolutionary groups managed to infiltrate Belgium, but the reinforced Belgian border troops were successful in keeping order, and the defeat at Risquons-Tout effectively ended the revolutionary threat to Belgium. Later two streets were named after the incident, and a monument was erected in the local cemetery.
