= Arrondissement of Avelgem =

Early-19th century political unit in Belgium

Coordinates: 50°46′37.45″N 3°26′58.95″E

The Arrondissement of Avelgem (Dutch: Arrondissement Avelgem; French: Arrondissement d'Avelgem) was a short-lived arrondissement in present-day Belgium. It was created out of the Arrondissement of Kortrijk in 1818, and it already ceased to exist in 1823.
