= Parc Arboretum du Manoir aux Loups =

Arboretum in Nord-Pas-de-Calais, France

Coordinates: 50.7624°N 3.1442°E

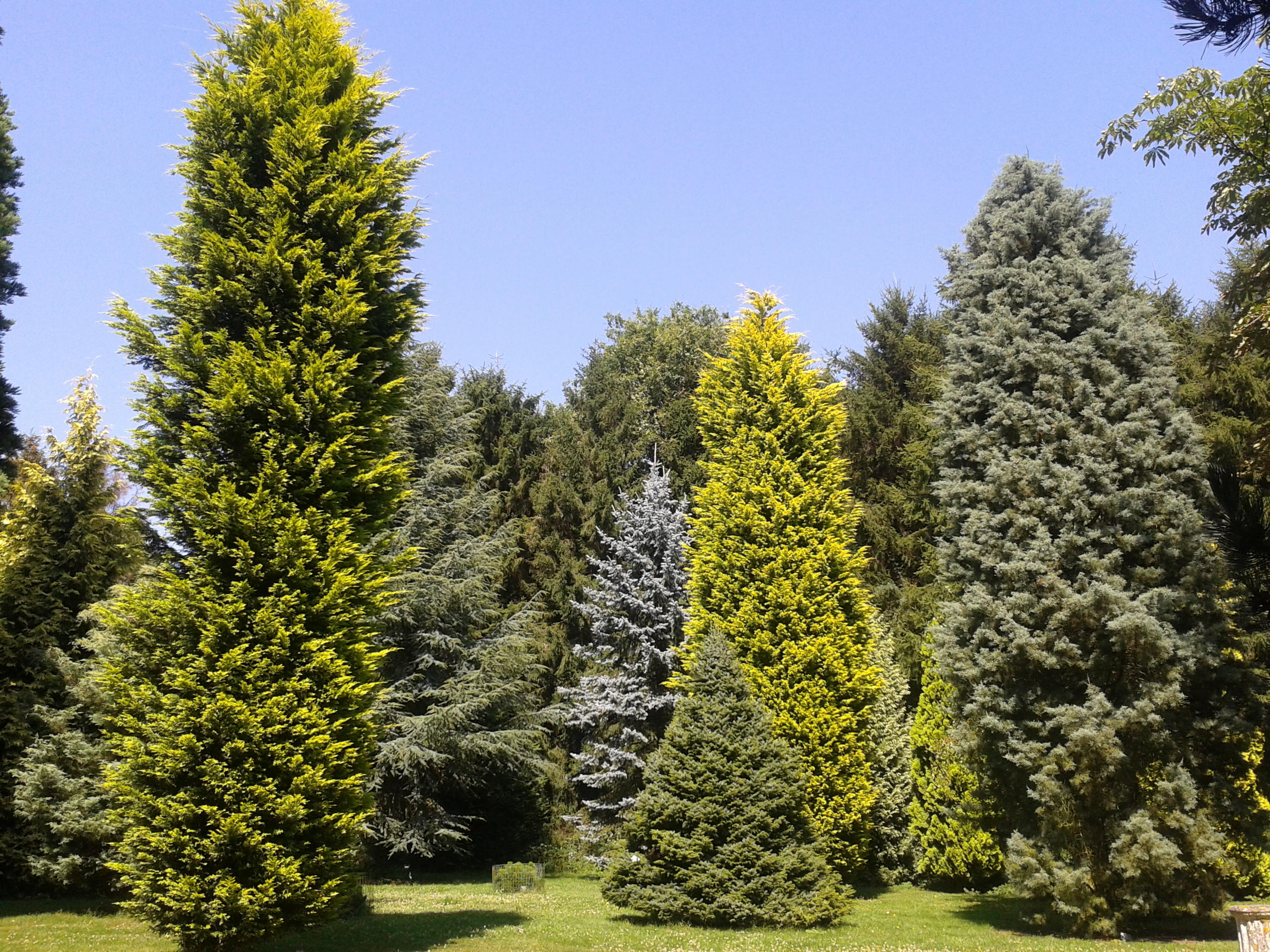
Parc Arboretum du Manoir aux Loups

The Parc Arboretum du Manoir aux Loups (5 hectares) is a private arboretum located at 300 Route de Neuville, Halluin, Nord, Nord-Pas-de-Calais, France. It is open in spring and fall plus summer Saturdays; an admission fee is charged.

== Some history and features ==
The park was created by Belgian landscape architect Jules Buyssens (1872–1958) in 1930, abandoned during World War II, and in 1950 remodeled by its current owner with English gardener Percy Stephen Cane (1881–1976), with its first arboretum trees planted in 1951. In 2004 it was designated a Jardin Remarquable by the Ministry of Culture.

=== Species of trees ===
Today the arboretum contains over a thousand trees, representing 324 conifer varieties and cultivars from five continents, and well as 80 species of deciduous trees. Specimens of interest include Abies nebrodensis, Calocedrus decurrens, Cedrus libani, Chamaecyparis lawsoniana, Chamaecyparis nootkatensis, Cupressocyparis leylandii, Larix decidua, Metasequoia glyptostroboides, Pinus sylvestris, Prunus subhirtella, and Quercus petraea.

== See also ==
- List of botanical gardens in France
