= Barrier town =

Fortified towns along the border between Austrian Netherlands (now Belgium) and France

The barrier towns were present-day Belgian towns, heavily fortified by the Dutch, on the Austrian Netherlands's border with France, and as such were particularly important in the wars between the Dutch Republic and Ancien Régime France. The Barrier Treaty made it possible for Austria to have its possessions in the Netherlands defended, whilst the Dutch Republic would not have to fight a war on its own territory.

In the 1713 Treaty of Utrecht the allies conferred the conquered city of Tournai on the Netherlands for use as a barrier town.. After further ratification, the barrier towns were Veurne, Ypres, Menen, Tournai, Mons, Charleroi, Namur and the citadel of Ghent.

In the War of the Austrian Succession, France conquered these towns, but at the end of the war was forced to return them to Austria by the 1748 Congress of Aix-la-Chapelle and the resulting Treaty. In 1781, the Austrian Emperor did not continue the Barrier Treaty, and the Dutch troops had to abandon the towns.

== See also ==
- Barrier Treaty
- history of the Netherlands
- history of Belgium
