= Rekkem =

Coordinates: 50.7844°N 3.1628°E

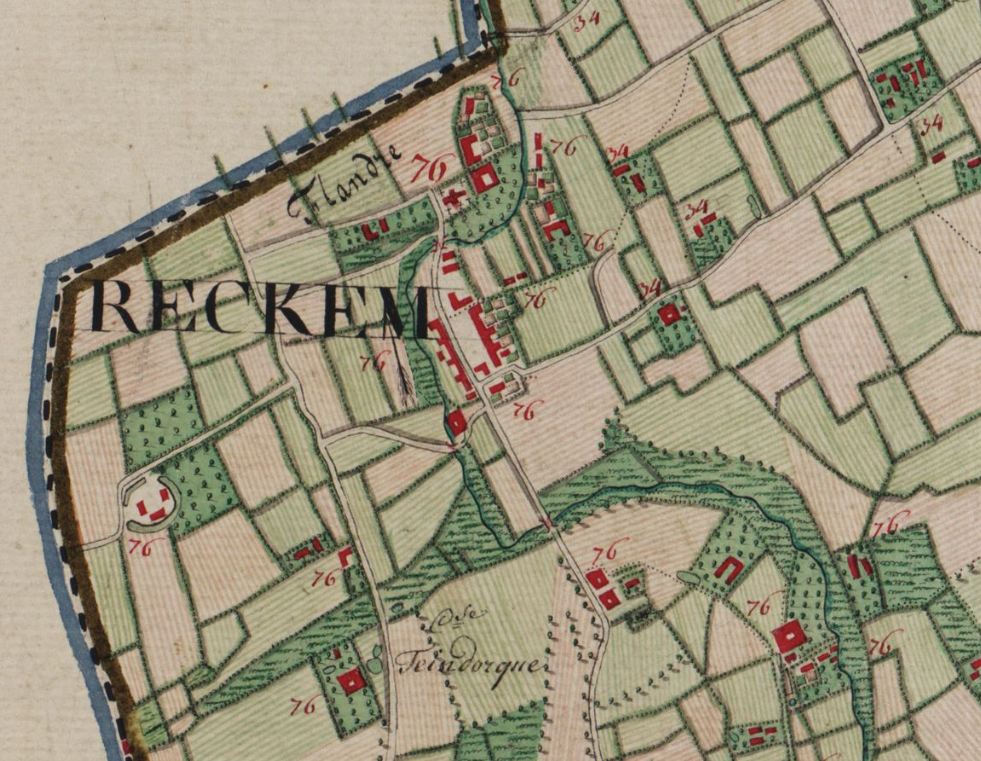

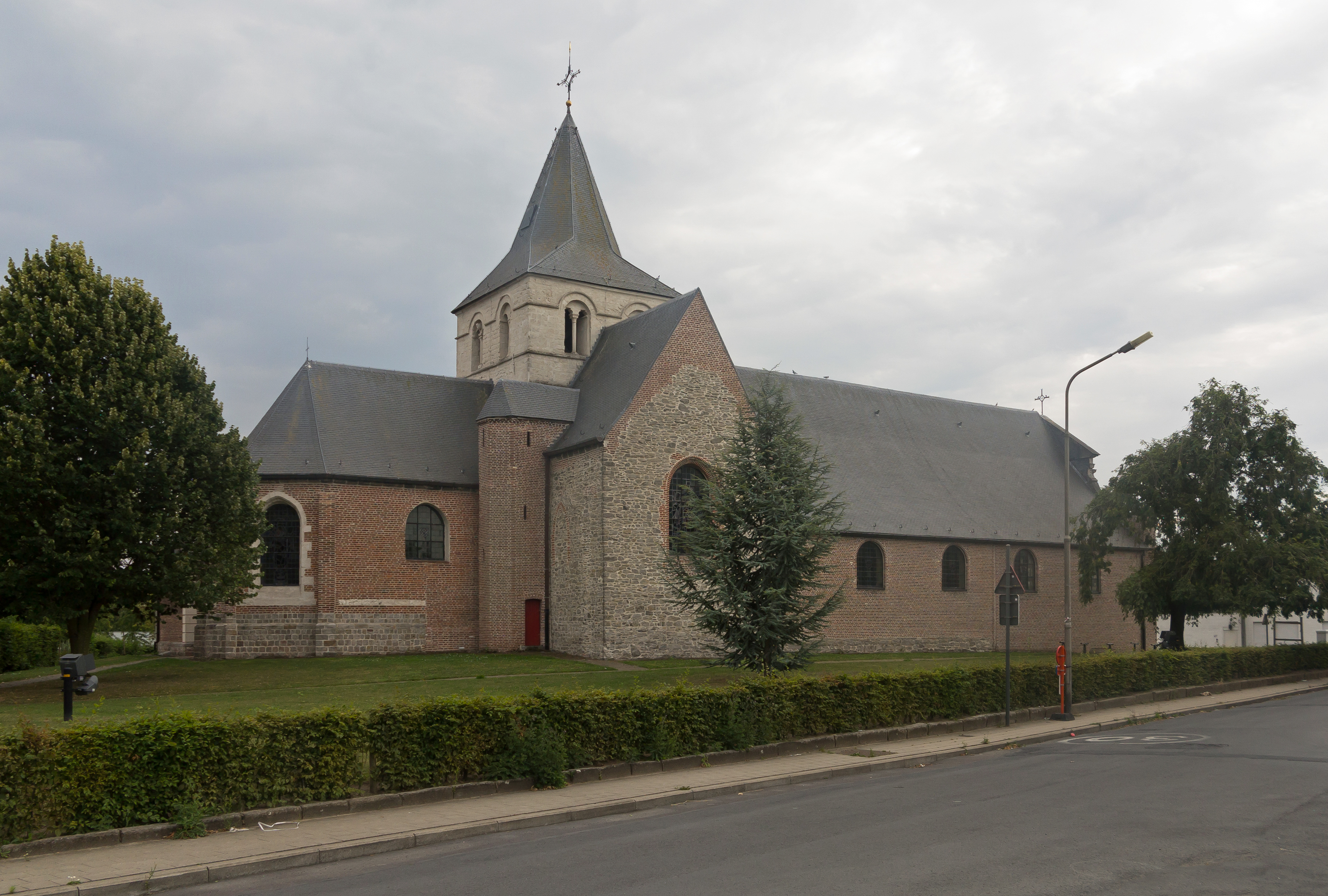
Church: parochiekerk Sint-Niklaas

Rekkem is a section of the Belgian city of Menen, in the province of West Flanders. Until 1977, it was an independent municipality. It was called Retchème in Picard. In 1173, the village was still called Rekkem, similar to Reclinghem in Artois and to Rijkegem (Tielt), which were founded by the Viking Rikiwulf in 876 .

== Geography ==
Rekkem is on the frontier with France and borders Wallonia. It adjoins the localities of Menen, Lauwe, Aalbeke, Mouscron (part of the municipality), Neuville-en-Ferrain and Halluin

The centre of Rekkem is located to the north of the territory while the village of Paradijs is located more to the south.

== Languages ==
The last complete linguistic census of 1947 indicated that over one quarter of the population used French as the "Language exclusively or most frequently spoken".

== Roads ==
The centre of the village is crossed by the N366 (Moeskroenstraat) that connects the centre of Menin and Mouscron. The Lauwestraat and the Priester Coulonstraat, connected to the National, are the link between Rekkem with Lauwe.

The Dronckaertstraat (the former road between Courtrai and Lille) and the A14 motorway (European route E17) pass between the centre of Rekkem and the village of Paradijs.

== History ==
In 1963, during the finalisation of the linguistic frontier, the hamlet of Risquons-Tout (0.39 km^{2} - approximately 500 inhabitants) was transferred from the commune of Rekkem to the city of Mouscron.

== Culture ==
Rekkem is the location of the head office of the Flemish-Dutch cultural association Ons Erfdeel, as well as the editorial offices of its periodicals de lage landen (formerly Ons Erfdeel), Septentrion, The Low Countries, and De Franse Nederlanden – Les Pays-Bas Français.

Jozef Deleu, writer and founder of Ons Erfdeel, lives in Rekkem.

== Curiosities ==
The parish church of Rekkem, the church of Saint Nicholas (Sint-Niklaaskerk) was built in the 12th century. It has been a classified monument since 1939.
