= Spiere-Helkijn =

- Municipality
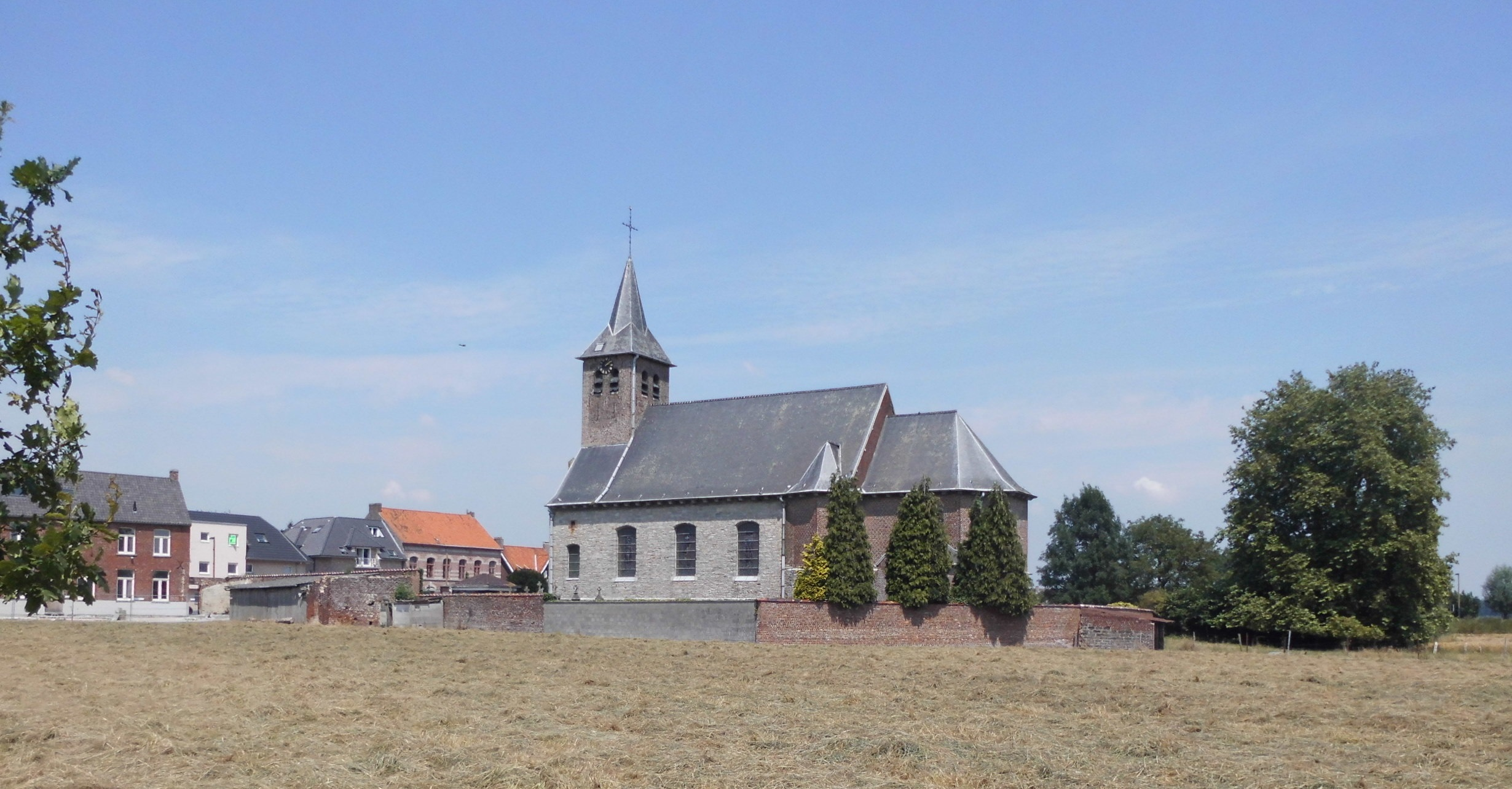
- Helkijn

- Flag Coat of arms

- Location of Spiere-Helkijn in West-Flanders
- Interactive map of Spiere-Helkijn
- Location in Belgium
- Coordinates: 50°43′N 03°21′E
- Country: Belgium
- Community: Flemish Community
- Region: Flemish Region
- Province: West Flanders
- Arrondissement: Kortrijk

Government
  - Mayor: Dirk Walraet (LB 2018)
  - Governing party: LB 2018

Area
  - Total: 10.81 km^{2} (4.17 sq mi)

Population (2018-01-01)
  - Total: 2,087
  - Density: 193.1/km^{2} (500.0/sq mi)
- Postal codes: 8587
- NIS code: 34043
- Area codes: 056
- Website: www.spiere-helkijn.be

Spiere-Helkijn (Dutch pronunciation: [ˌspiːrə ˈɦɛlkɛin]; French: Espierres-Helchin, French pronunciation: [ɛspjɛʁ ɛlʃɛ̃]; West Flemish: Spiere-Elkyng) is a municipality located in the Belgian province of West Flanders. The municipality comprises the towns of Helkijn and Spiere. On January 1, 2018, Spiere-Helkijn had a total population of 2,087. The total area is 10.78 km^{2} which gives a population density of 194 inhabitants per km^{2}.
