= Françoise Chombar =

Belgian businesswoman

- Born: May 1962 (age 64)
- Education: Ghent University
- Occupations: CEO, semiconductors
- Title: CEO, Melexis
- Term: 2004 -
- Predecessor: Rudi de Winter

Françoise Chombar (born May 1962) is a Belgian businesswoman. She is the CEO and a co-founder of the semiconductor company Melexis. She took over as CEO from her husband and co-founder Rudi de Winter in 2004, having previously been the COO of the company since 1997. She is also a non-executive board member for Soitec and Umicore, and a member of the advisory board at Byteflies.

She has a master's degree from Ghent University in interpreting Dutch-English-Spanish.

== STEM and gender equality work ==
Françoise Chombar is the president of STEM Platform, an independent advisory body to the Flemish government on children's STEM education. She also promotes gender equality through involvement in organizations including Women on Board, an association that aims to give women better access to directorial roles in Belgian companies, and SOFIA Academy, a networking program for female managers and entrepreneurs in Hasselt University, where she has been a mentor for 17 years.

== Recognition ==
In 2016, she won the Vlerick Award, given out by the Vlerick Business School for excellence in management. It was the first time the management award was won by a female entrepreneur.

In 2018, Chombar was awarded the BNP Paribas Global Prize for Women Entrepreneurs, and was named the ICT Personality of the Year by Belgian magazine DataNews. She was also awarded a Science Fellowship at Free University of Brussels-VUB the same year.

In 2019, Chombar received the Flemish Community Honor for her work as a STEM and gender balance advocate and was named the Limburg Entrepreneur of the Year by Belgian newspaper Het Belang van Limburg.

In 2020, she was elected to Inspiring Fifty Belgium, a list of the 50 most inspiring women in the Belgian technology sector.
