= Arrondissement of Menen =

Early-19th century political unit in Belgium

Coordinates: 50°47′46.21″N 3°7′19.22″E

The Arrondissement of Menen (Dutch: Arrondissement Menen; French: Arrondissement de Menin) was a short-lived arrondissement in the present-day Province of West Flanders, Belgium. It was created in 1818 and it already ceased to exist in 1823.
