= Roncq =

- Commune
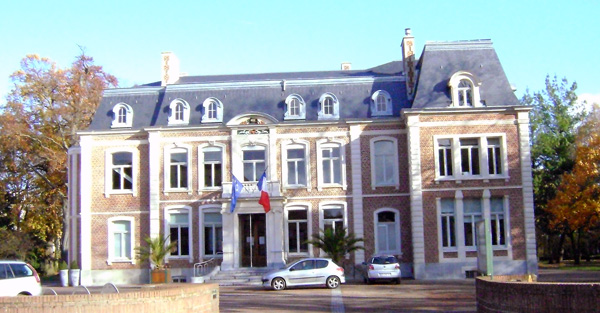
- The town hall in Roncq

- Coat of arms
- Location of Roncq
- Location within France Location within Hauts-de-France
- Coordinates: 50°45′16″N 3°07′16″E
- Country: France
- Region: Hauts-de-France
- Department: Nord
- Arrondissement: Lille
- Canton: Tourcoing-1
- Intercommunality: Métropole Européenne de Lille

Government
  - Mayor (2020–2026): Rodrigue Desmet
- Area^{1}: 10.59 km^{2} (4.09 sq mi)
- Elevation: 32 m (105 ft)
- Highest elevation: 54 m (177 ft)
- Lowest elevation: 17 m (56 ft)
- Population (2023): 14,075
  - Density: 1,329/km^{2} (3,442/sq mi)
- Time zone: UTC+01:00 (CET)
  - Summer (DST): UTC+02:00 (CEST)
- INSEE/Postal code: 59508 /59223
- ^{1} French Land Register data, which excludes lakes, ponds, glaciers > 1 km^{2} (0.386 sq mi or 247 acres) and river estuaries.

Roncq (French pronunciation: [ʁɔ̃k]; Dutch: Ronk) is a commune in the Nord department in northern France.

It is 3 km (2 mi) from the border with Belgium.

== Population ==
Historical population
Year	Pop.	±% p.a.
1968	7,820	—
1975	10,756	+4.66%
1982	11,725	+1.24%
1990	12,035	+0.33%
1999	12,705	+0.60%
2007	12,776	+0.07%
2012	13,366	+0.91%
2017	13,388	+0.03%
2023	14,075	+0.84%
Source: INSEE

== Heraldry ==
Arms of Roncq	The arms of Roncq are blazoned : Argent, 3 lions sable armed and langued gules.

== Twin towns ==
It is twinned with Todmorden in Britain, Delbrück in Germany, and Selinkegny in Mali.

== See also ==
- Communes of the Nord department
