= Arrondissement of Wakken =

Former provincial district in West Flanders, Belgium

Coordinates: 50°56′1.39″N 3°23′50.14″E

The Arrondissement of Wakken (Dutch: Arrondissement Wakken) was a short-lived arrondissement in the present-day Province of West Flanders, Belgium. It was created in 1818 and it already ceased to exist in 1823.
