= Halluin =

- Commune
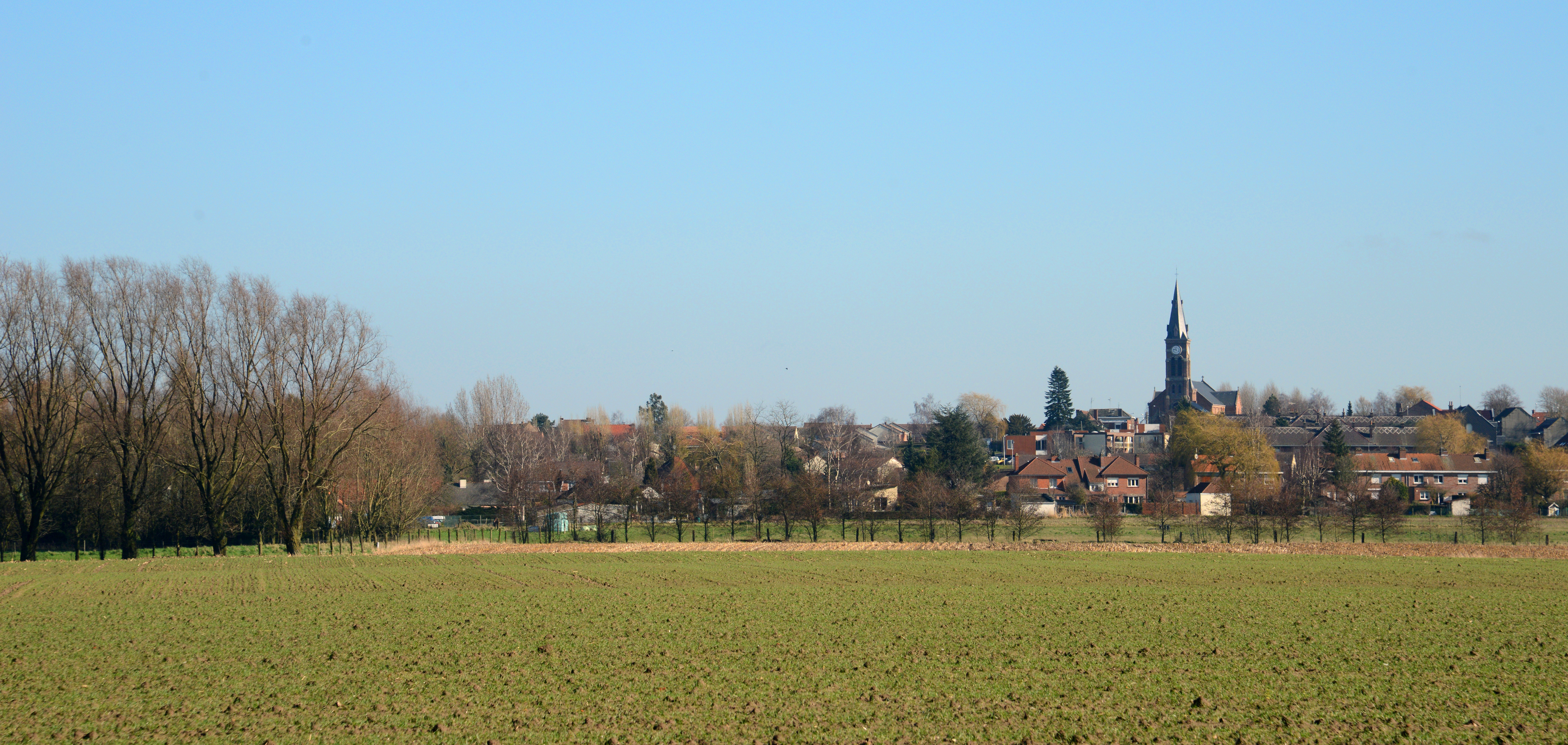
- Mont d'Halluin district

- Coat of arms
- Location of Halluin
- Location within France Location within Hauts-de-France
- Coordinates: 50°47′01″N 3°07′32″E
- Country: France
- Region: Hauts-de-France
- Department: Nord
- Arrondissement: Lille
- Canton: Tourcoing-1
- Intercommunality: Métropole Européenne de Lille

Government
  - Mayor (2021–2026): Jean-Christophe Destailleur
- Area^{1}: 12.56 km^{2} (4.85 sq mi)
- Elevation: 20 m (66 ft)
- Population (2023): 20,715
  - Density: 1,649/km^{2} (4,272/sq mi)
- Time zone: UTC+01:00 (CET)
  - Summer (DST): UTC+02:00 (CEST)
- INSEE/Postal code: 59279 /59250
- ^{1} French Land Register data, which excludes lakes, ponds, glaciers > 1 km^{2} (0.386 sq mi or 247 acres) and river estuaries.

Halluin (French pronunciation: [alɥɛ̃]; Dutch: Halewijn) is a commune in the Nord department in northern France.

== Geography ==
It is located at the north of the Métropole Européenne de Lille, on the Belgian border, contiguous with the Belgian town of Menen.

== History ==
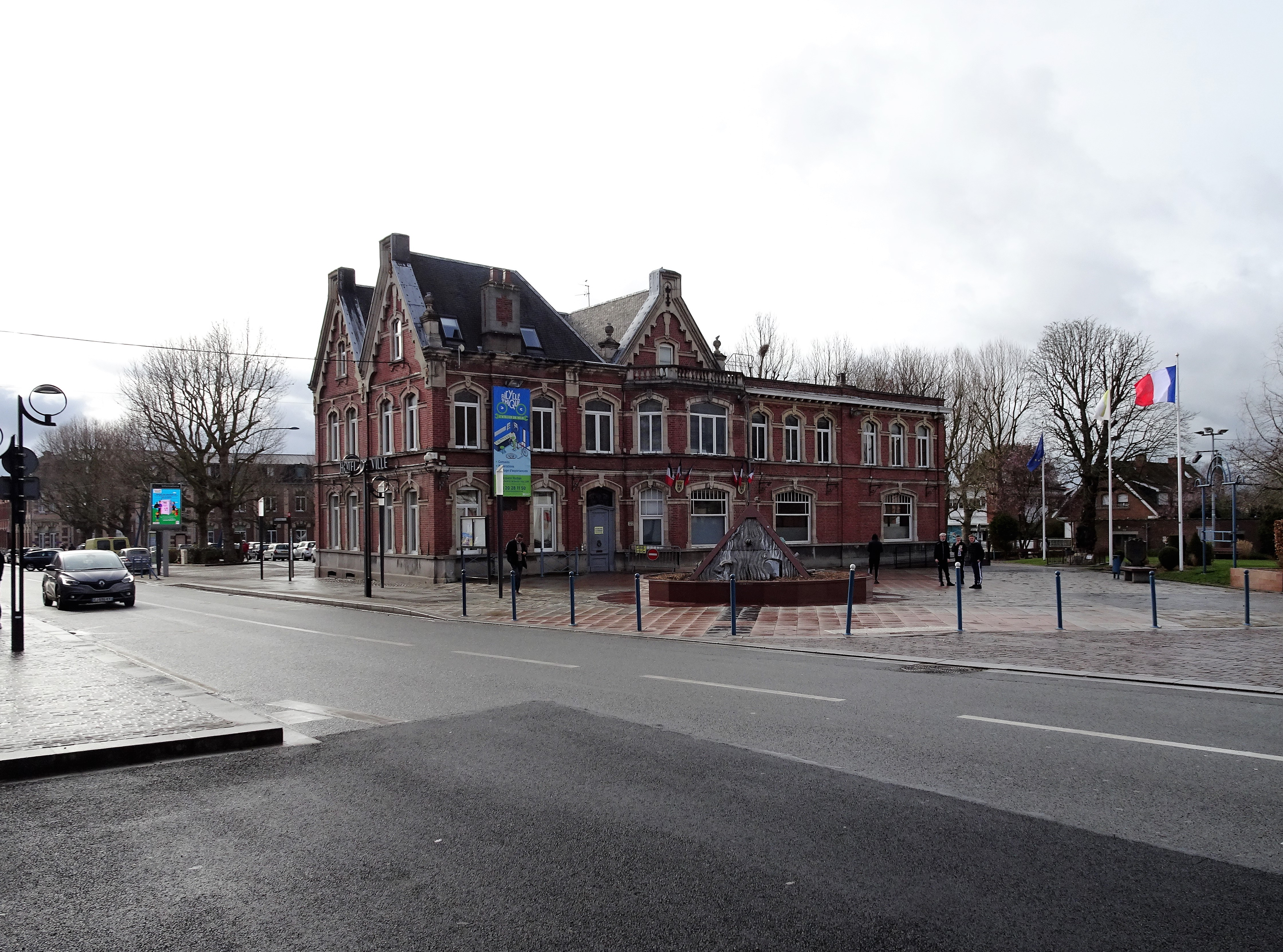
The Hôtel de Ville

The family of Halluin is mentioned as early as the 13th century. In 1587 the title of duke and peer of the realm was granted to it, but in the succeeding century it became extinct. The Hôtel de Ville is a former private residence dating from the late-19th century.

== Population ==
Historical population

Year	Pop.	±% p.a.
1793	3,030	—
1800	2,459	−2.94%
1806	2,831	+2.38%
1821	3,242	+0.91%
1831	3,750	+1.47%
1836	4,240	+2.49%
1841	4,264	+0.11%
1846	4,851	+2.61%
1851	5,408	+2.20%
1856	8,410	+9.23%
1861	10,803	+5.14%
1866	13,673	+4.82%
1872	12,946	−0.91%
1876	13,771	+1.56%
1881	14,020	+0.36%
1886	14,678	+0.92%
1891	14,841	+0.22%
1896	15,781	+1.24%
1901	16,599	+1.02%

Year	Pop.	±% p.a.
1906	16,158	−0.54%
1911	15,480	−0.85%
1921	13,760	−1.17%
1926	13,932	+0.25%
1931	13,588	−0.50%
1936	13,278	−0.46%
1946	12,935	−0.26%
1954	13,345	+0.39%
1962	14,138	+0.72%
1968	14,829	+0.80%
1975	15,491	+0.63%
1982	16,444	+0.86%
1990	17,629	+0.87%
1999	18,997	+0.83%
2007	19,757	+0.49%
2012	20,770	+1.01%
2017	20,800	+0.03%
2023	20,715	−0.07%

Source: EHESS and INSEE (1968-2023)

== Transport ==
The Halluin railway station, closed in the 1970s, was situated on the Somain-Halluin Railway. The town is now served by buses of Ilévia.

The A22 autoroute links the town to Lille and Belgium.

== Heraldry ==
Arms of Halluin	The arms of Halluin are blazoned : Argent, 3 lions sable langued gules, armed and crowned Or.

== Politics ==
An erstwhile bastion of the left, Halluin owes its nickname Halluin the Red to the powerful trade unions who used their influence to support Communist mayors during the interwar period. However, since the 1990s Halluin has become gentrified (see also below), and in the 2007 and 2012 presidential elections the town backed Nicolas Sarkozy.

In the 2014 mayoral elections, 62% of voters chose right-wing parties: Gustave Dassonville (UMP) received 40% of the votes and Jean‑Christophe Destailleur (Centre-right) received 22% of the votes. Left-wing parties, with 38% of the votes, were defeated, and Gustave Dassonville was elected. Six years later, in 2020, Jean‑Christophe Destailleur (Centre-right) was elected mayor of Halluin.

Despite the noted gentrification of Halluin, the neighbouring town of Menen, Belgium, situated within walking distance of central Halluin, underwent a simultaneous radicalization, given the municipality's attempts to ban its employees from speaking French to Francophone people whose command of Dutch may be limited, and to use sign language instead. While some townsfolk of Halluin's adjoining conurbation may have regarded this as a brave attempt to enforce Flemish supremacy over Francophone neighbours, others, including Francophone neighbours themselves, and international observers may have regarded such a measure as allegedly fanatical and insensitive to the needs of Francophone neighbours with limited command of Dutch. International press comment was provoked by these municipal regulations.

== Points of interest ==
- Parc Arboretum du Manoir aux Loups

== Twin towns ==
Halluin is twinned with:

- Menen, Belgium
- Oer-Erkenschwick, Germany - since 1969
- North Tyneside, England - since 1994
- Pniewy, Poland - since 1998
- Lübbenau, Germany - since 2000
- Kočevje, Slovenia - since 2000
- Zulte, Belgium - since 2010

== See also ==
- Communes of the Nord department
