= Neuville-en-Ferrain =

- Commune
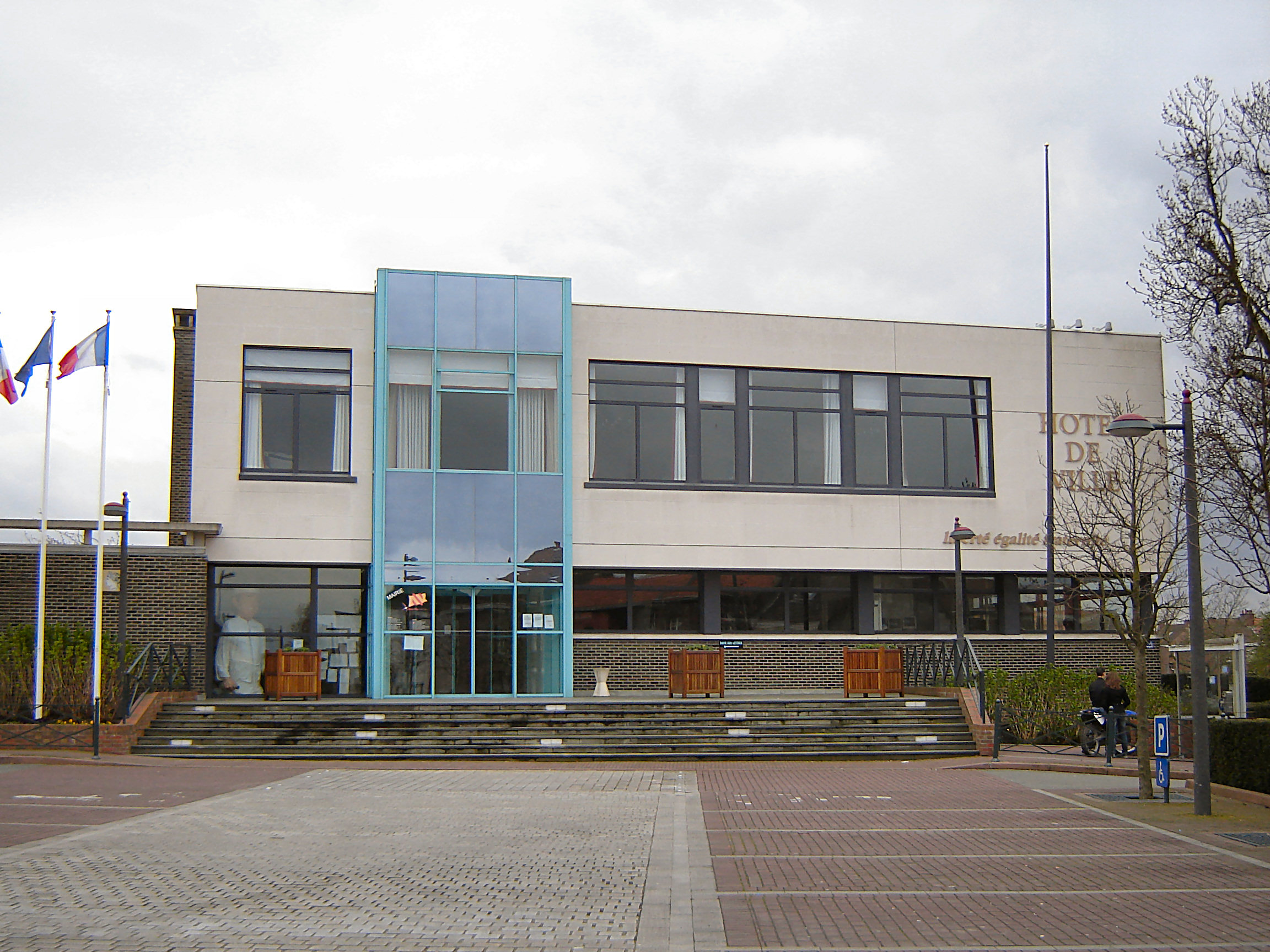
- The town hall in Neuville-en-Ferrain

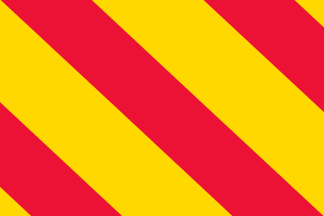
- Flag Coat of arms
- Location of Neuville-en-Ferrain
- Location within France Location within Hauts-de-France
- Coordinates: 50°44′50″N 3°09′32″E
- Country: France
- Region: Hauts-de-France
- Department: Nord
- Arrondissement: Lille
- Canton: Tourcoing-1
- Intercommunality: Métropole Européenne de Lille

Government
  - Mayor (2020–2026): Marie Tonnerre-Desmet
- Area^{1}: 6.18 km^{2} (2.39 sq mi)
- Elevation: 40 m (130 ft)
- Highest elevation: 52 m (171 ft)
- Lowest elevation: 30 m (98 ft)
- Population (2023): 10,002
  - Density: 1,620/km^{2} (4,190/sq mi)
- Time zone: UTC+01:00 (CET)
  - Summer (DST): UTC+02:00 (CEST)
- INSEE/Postal code: 59426 /59960
- ^{1} French Land Register data, which excludes lakes, ponds, glaciers > 1 km^{2} (0.386 sq mi or 247 acres) and river estuaries.

Neuville-en-Ferrain (French pronunciation: [nøvil ɑ̃ fɛʁɛ̃]) is a commune in the Nord department in northern France. It is part of the Métropole Européenne de Lille.

== Population ==
Historical population
Year	Pop.	±% p.a.
1968	5,553	—
1975	8,090	+5.52%
1982	9,040	+1.60%
1990	9,895	+1.14%
1999	9,527	−0.42%
2007	9,508	−0.02%
2012	10,280	+1.57%
2017	10,284	+0.01%
2023	10,002	−0.46%
Source: INSEE

== Heraldry ==
Arms of Neuville-en-Ferrain	The arms of Neuville-en-Ferrain are blazoned : Or, 3 bends gules.

== See also ==
- Communes of the Nord department
