= Walter Hauck =

German SS officer in WWII (1918–2006)

- Born: 4 June 1918; Freiburg im Breisgau, German Empire
- Died: 6 November 2006 (aged 88); Germany
- Known for: Ascq massacre Leskovice massacre

Walter Hauck (4 June 1918 – 6 November 2006) was a German SS officer infamous for the atrocities committed under his command during the Second World War.

Before the war, Hauck worked in the German police. By 1944, he had the rank of SS-Obersturmführer in the 12th SS Panzer Division Hitlerjugend and led the 2nd company of the 12th SS Reconnaissance Battalion. In April 1944, he was responsible for the Ascq massacre in which 86 civilians were shot and the population brutalized after a railway sabotage. In May 1945, accompanied by Hildegarde Mende, previously a guard in the Theresienstadt Ghetto, Hauck was responsible for another massacre in Leskovice, Protectorate of Bohemia and Moravia, leading to the death of 25 civilians, including a 13-year-old boy, and the destruction of 31 houses.

In 1949, Hauck was judged in Lille, France, for the Ascq massacre and was sentenced to death. After requests for mercy from some widows of the Ascq massacre, his sentence was converted to life imprisonment. In 1957, he was freed after a further reduction and returned to Germany, where he lived until his death in 2006.

In 1969 and 1977, Czechoslovakia asked Germany to extradite him for punishment for the second massacre, but these requests were rejected by the Stuttgart court. In 2005, the Czech Republic again asked for his extradition.
