= Ascq massacre =

Massacre during the Second World War

- Part of the German occupation of France
- Location: Ascq, France
- Date: 1 April 1944
- Deaths: 86 killed
- Victim: French civilians
- Perpetrators: Nazi Germany, 12th SS Panzer Division Hitlerjugend

Location of Ascq in France

The Ascq massacre was a massacre of 86 men on 1 April 1944 in Ascq, France, by the Waffen-SS during the Second World War.

The 12th SS Panzer Division Hitlerjugend set out by rail for Normandy at the end of March, 1944. On 1 April, their train was approaching the gare d'Ascq, a junction where three railroads intersected, when an explosion blew the line apart, causing two cars to derail. The commander of the convoy, SS Obersturmführer Walter Hauck, ordered troops to search and arrest all male members of the houses on both sides of the track. Altogether 70 men were shot beside the railway line, with another 16 killed in the village itself. Six more men were arrested and charged with the bomb attack after an investigation by the Gestapo; they were eventually ordered to be executed by firing squad.

The Oberfeldkommandant of Lille justified the massacre, stating:

The population must know that any attack on German units or individual soldiers will be responded to by all means required by the situation. The example of Ascq must be a lesson. In the nature of things it is inevitable that innocent people will suffer when such things happen. Responsibility lies with the criminals who make such attacks.

At the end of the war, some SS men stood trial in a French Military Court at Lille. They were sentenced to death; later their sentences were commuted to imprisonment. The last prisoner, Walter Hauck, was released in July 1957. Hauck also instigated a similar massacre in Leskovice in May 1945.

After the massacre, 60,000 workers started a strike in Lille — one of the most important demonstrations in France during World War II under German occupation. It is estimated that at least 20,000 people were present at the funerals in the village.

== See also ==
- Lidice massacre
- List of massacres in France
- Putten raid in the Netherlands

== Bibliography ==
- Édouard Catel, Le Crime des nazis à Ascq, Croix du Nord, Lille, 1944. Reedited by Société historique de Villeneuve-d'Ascq et du Mélantois (SHVAM) in 1996.
- Louis Wech, J'accuse, Imprimerie Boulonnais, Ascq, 1945. Reedited by SHVAM in 1996.
- Jacob Louis, Crimes hitlériens : Ascq - Le Vercor, Éd. Mellotte, collection "Libération" 1946.
- Die faschistische Okkupationspolitik in Frankreich (1940- 1944) Dokumentenauswahl. Hg. und Einl. Ludwig Nestler. Berlin: Deutscher Verlag der Wissenschaften, 1990 ISBN 3326002971.
- Docteur Jean-Marie Mocq La 12^{e} SS Hitlerjugend massacre Ascq, cité martyre (album historique), Éd. Heimdal, 1994
- Claudia Moisel, Frankreich und die deutschen Kriegsverbrecher: Politik und Praxis der Strafverfolgung nach dem Zweiten Weltkrieg. Göttingen: Wallstein, 2004 ISBN 3892447497.
