= Ascq Communal Cemetery =

Cemetery in Villeneuve d'Ascq, France

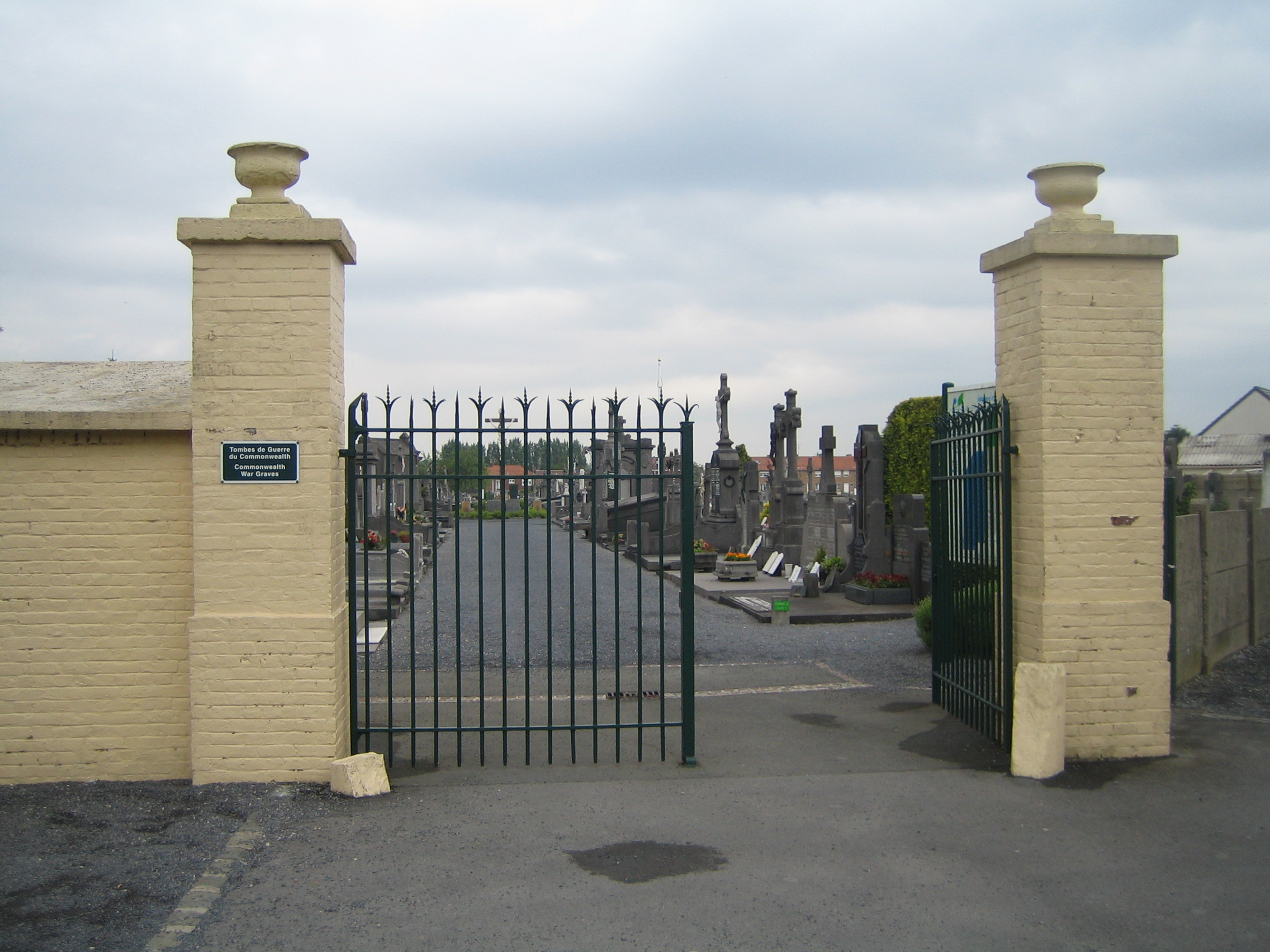
- One of the entrance of Ascq Communal Cemetery
- Interactive map of Ascq Communal Cemetery

Details
- Location: Villeneuve d'Ascq
- Country: France
- Coordinates: 50°37′09″N 3°09′57″E
- Type: Public
- Size: ?
- No. of graves: ?
- Find a Grave: Ascq Communal Cemetery

Ascq Communal Cemetery is a cemetery located in the former village of Ascq, today a district of Villeneuve d'Ascq, Nord, France.

== Organisation ==
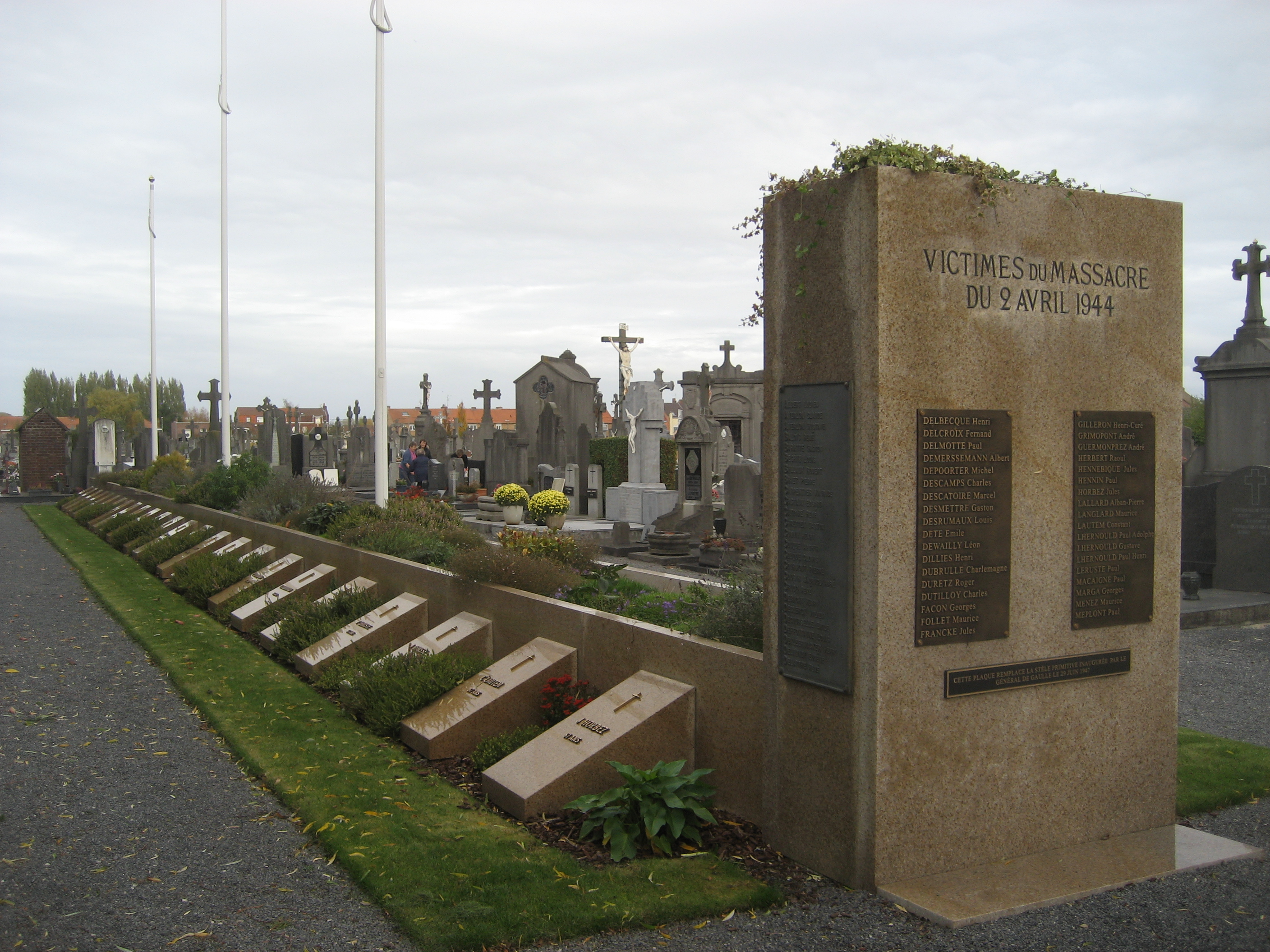
Ascq massacre graves

The cemetery shelters primarily graves of civilians, but has two particularities: it shelters British and Commonwealth war graves, as well as the bodies of the victims of the Ascq massacre in 1944.

== Commonwealth war graves ==
The cemetery hosts Commonwealth war graves of the First World War and the Second World War.

=== History ===
At the end of 1918 and in 1919, some British units were posted in Ascq for a few months:

- the 229th Field Ambulance,
- the 13th and 63rd Casualty Clearing Stations,
- the 39th Stationary Hospital.

=== Casualties ===
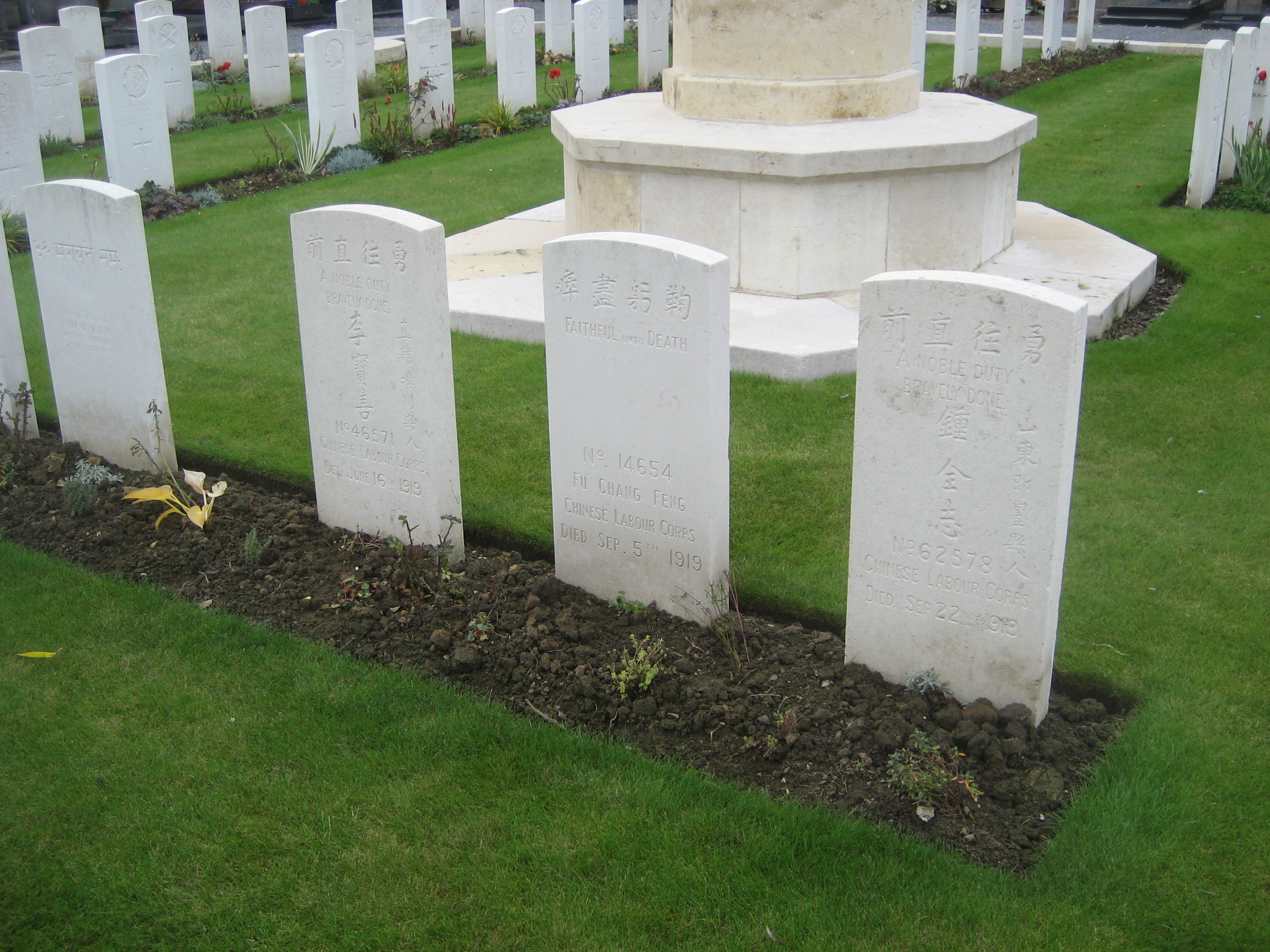
Chinese war graves inside the Commonwealth war graves

Country	Victims
United-Kingdom	50
China	4
India	2
Canada	1
Australia	1
Total	58

On the cemetery are 55 victims of the First World War (died between November 7, 1914 and September 5, 1919) and 3 victims of the Second World War (died on May 24-25, 1940).

The 4 Chinese victims were workers from the Chinese Labour Corps.

=== See also ===
- Commonwealth War Graves Commission
- Chinese Labour Corps
