= Ascq =

Village in Nord, France

Coordinates: 50°37′N 3°10′E

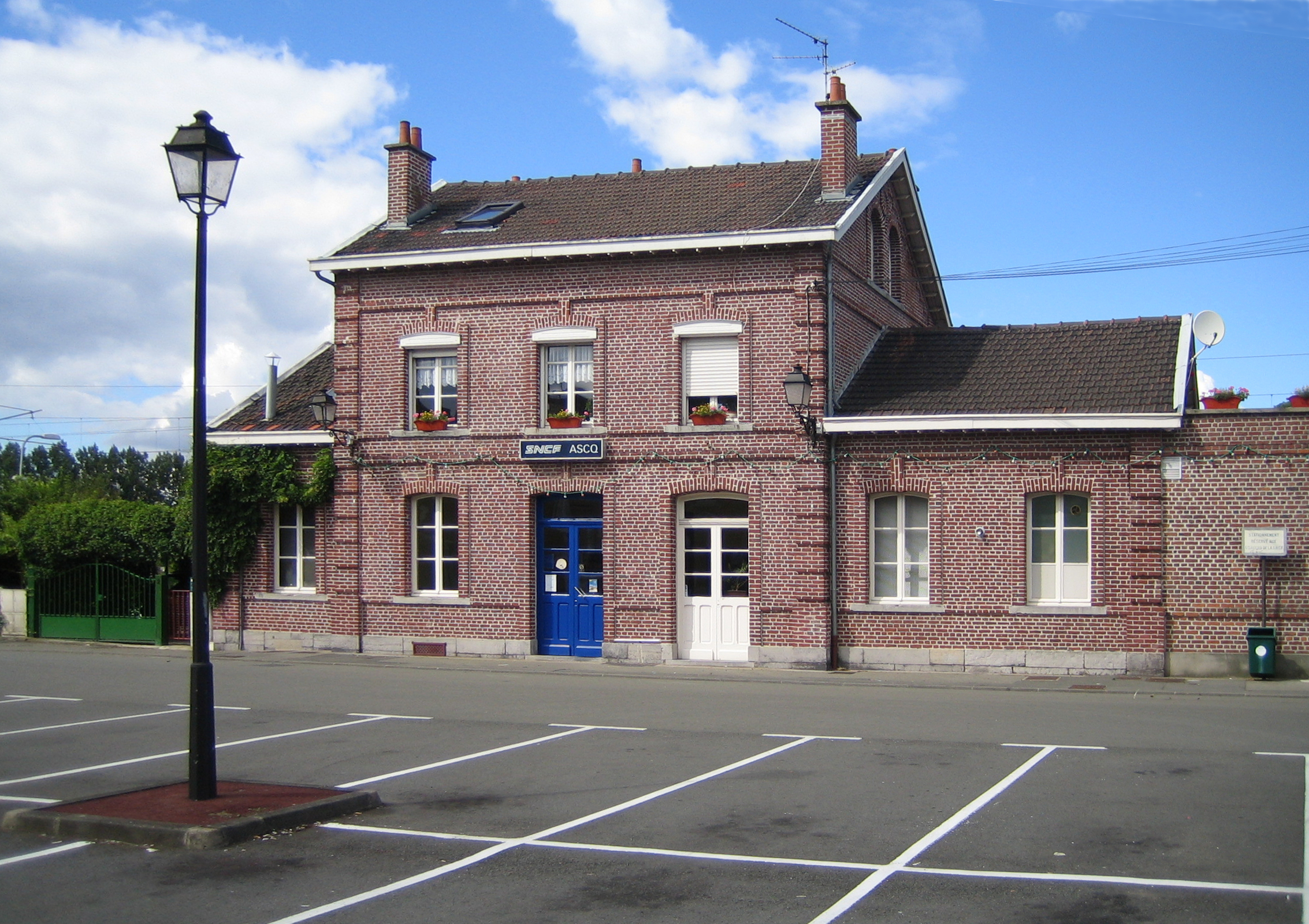
Ascq train station

Ascq (French pronunciation: [ask]; Picard: Ask) is a former commune on the Marque river in the Nord department in northern France, seven kilometers from Belgium. Agricultural village until the Industrial Revolution, the former independent commune merged with others to become a district of the new town planned community of Villeneuve-d'Ascq since 1970. The operatic bass Louis-Henri Obin (1820–1895) was born in Ascq.

Ascq is known for the Ascq massacre of 1 April 1944, where the Nazis assaulted the inhabitants and massacred 86 innocent men. The village was decorated with the Croix de guerre 1939–1945 and the Legion of Honour.

The Gare d'Ascq (railway station) is served by trains from Lille to Liège (Belgium) and to Orchies.

== Heraldry ==
Arms of Ascq	The arms of Ascq are blazoned : Or, a fess azure, overall a saltire gules.

== Architecture and points of interest ==
Ascq main monuments are Saint-Pierre-en-Antioche Church (19th century), based on a building of 15th century, gare d'Ascq (19th century) railway station, the post office, the town hall (20th century) and the Château Claeys (20th century).

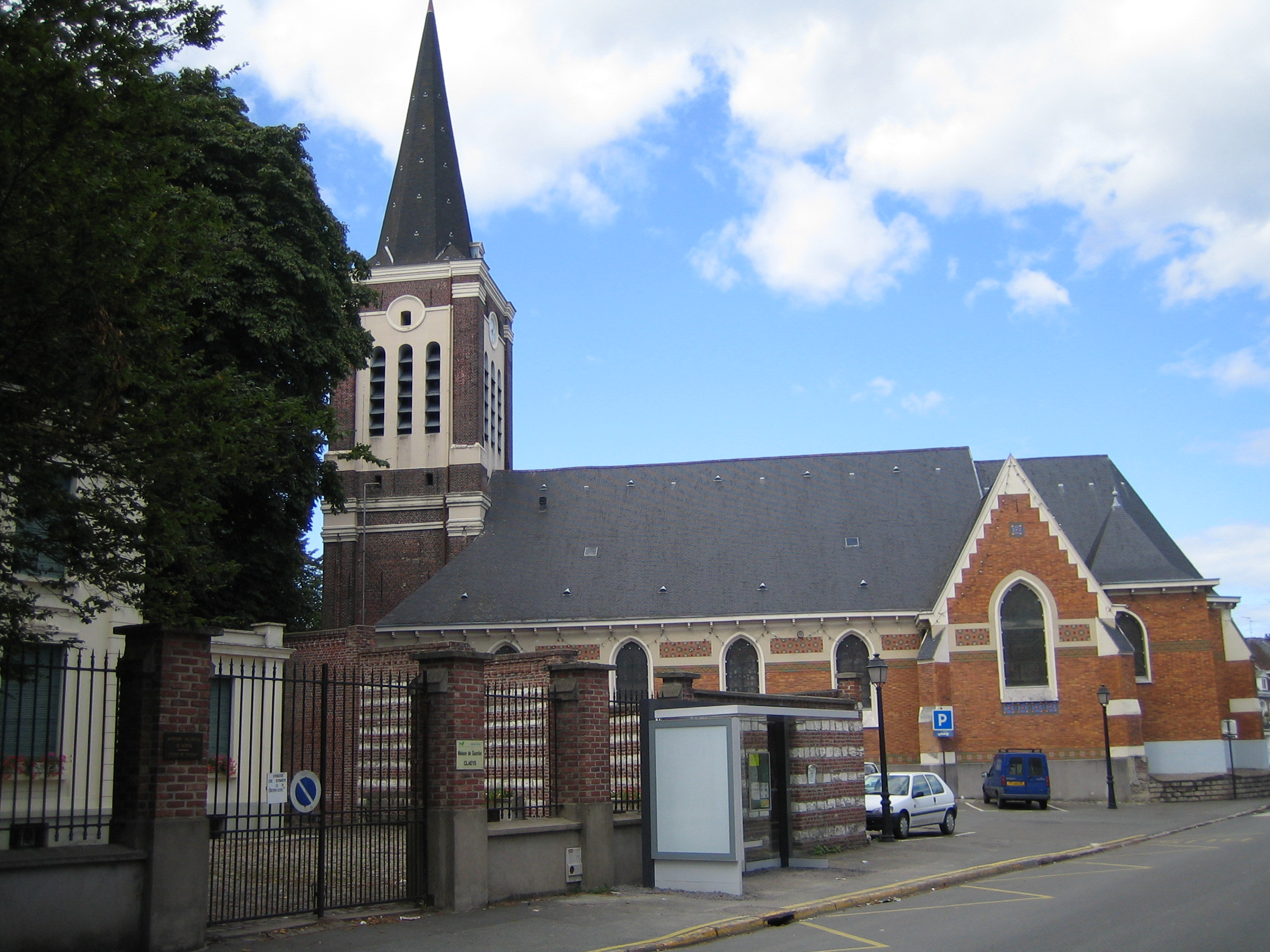
Saint-Pierre-en-Antioche Church

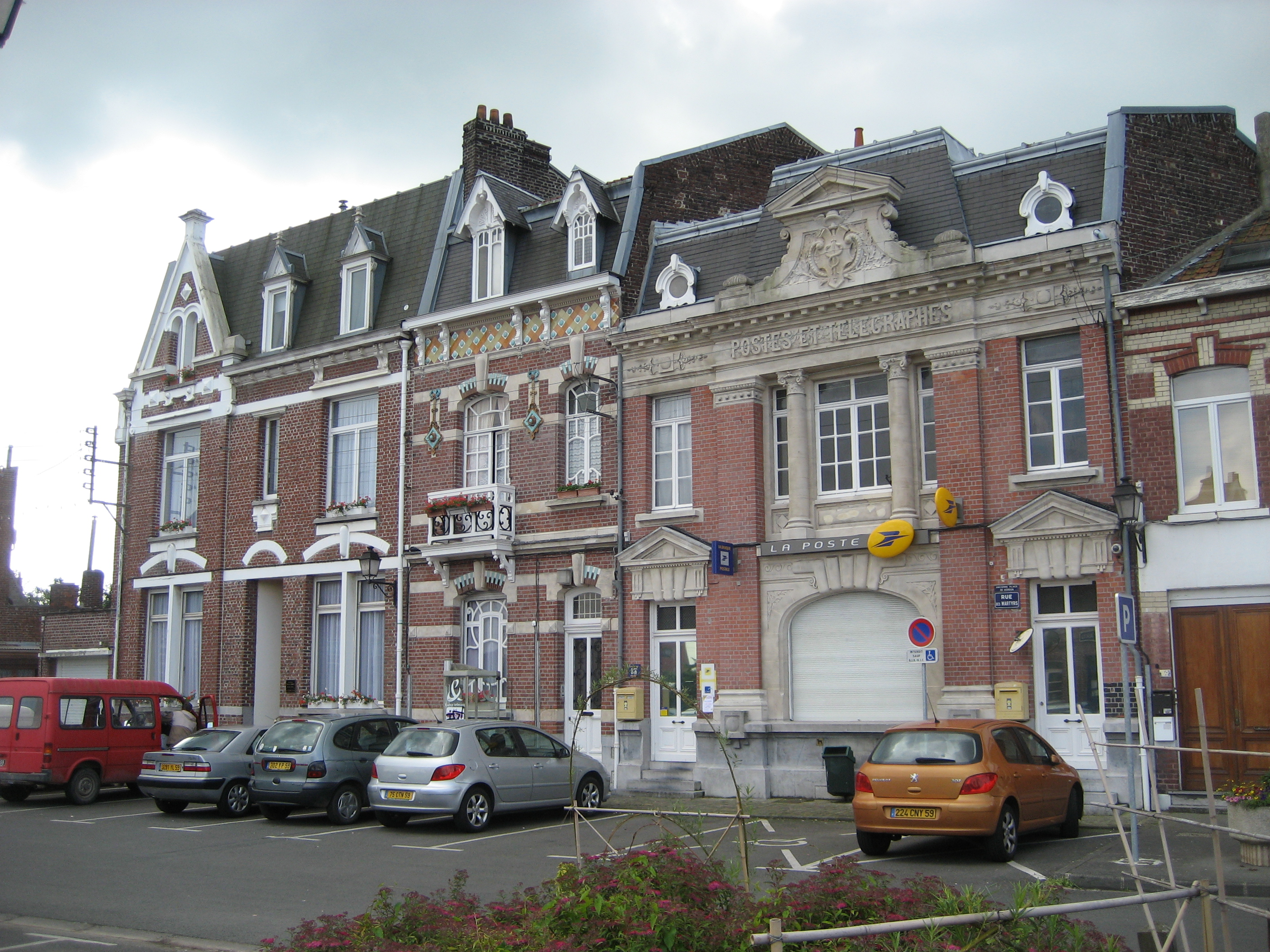
Post office and railway station square

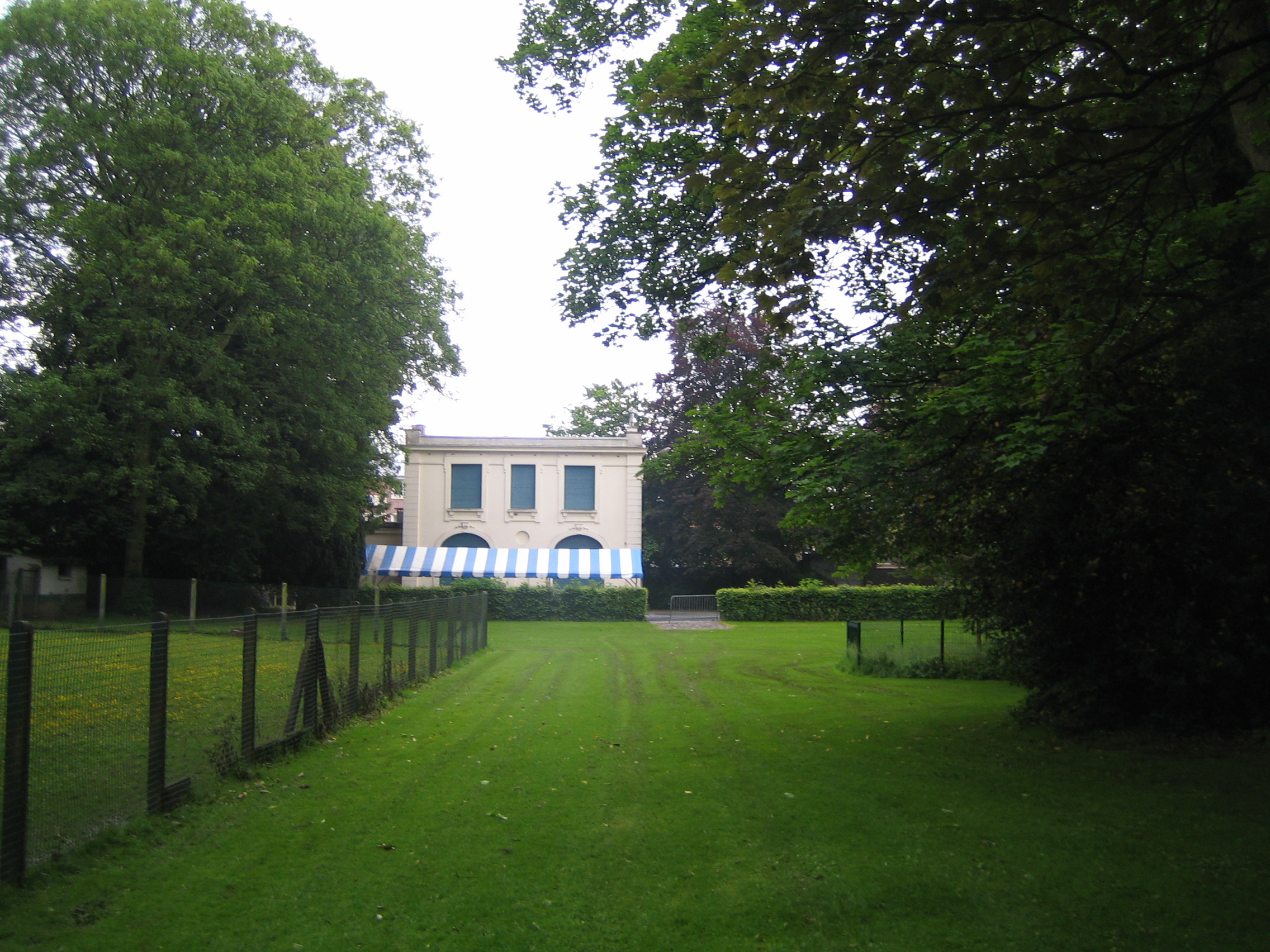
Château Claeys

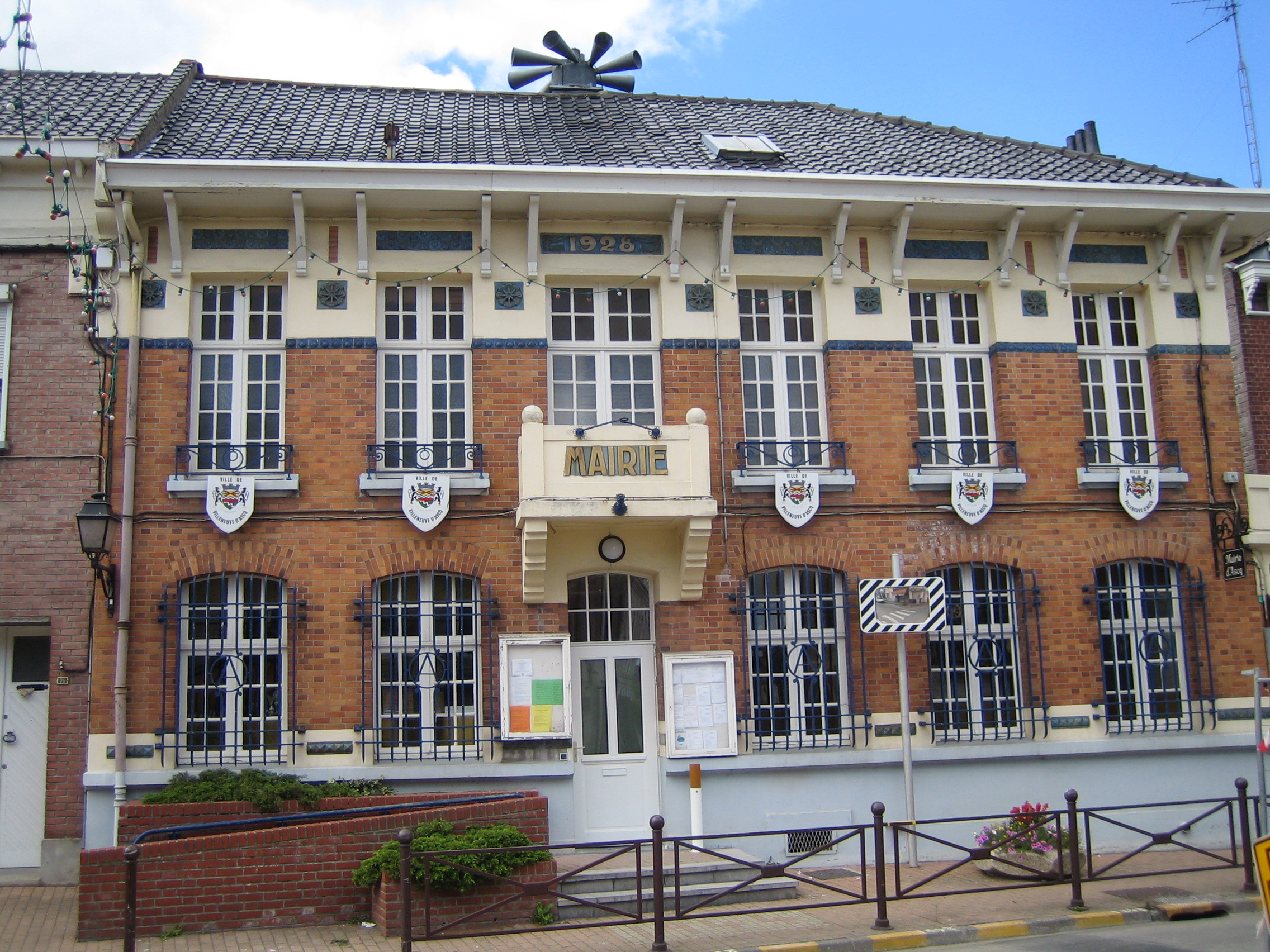
Ascq town hall

Numerous places are commemorating the world wars : Tertre des massacrés monument, mémorial Ascq 1944 museum, Ascq Communal Cemetery which shelters British and Commonwealth war graves as well as the bodies of the victims of Ascq massacre in 1944, a monument on Saint-Pierre-en-Antioche Church square and some street names, such as 'Rue des Martyrs'.

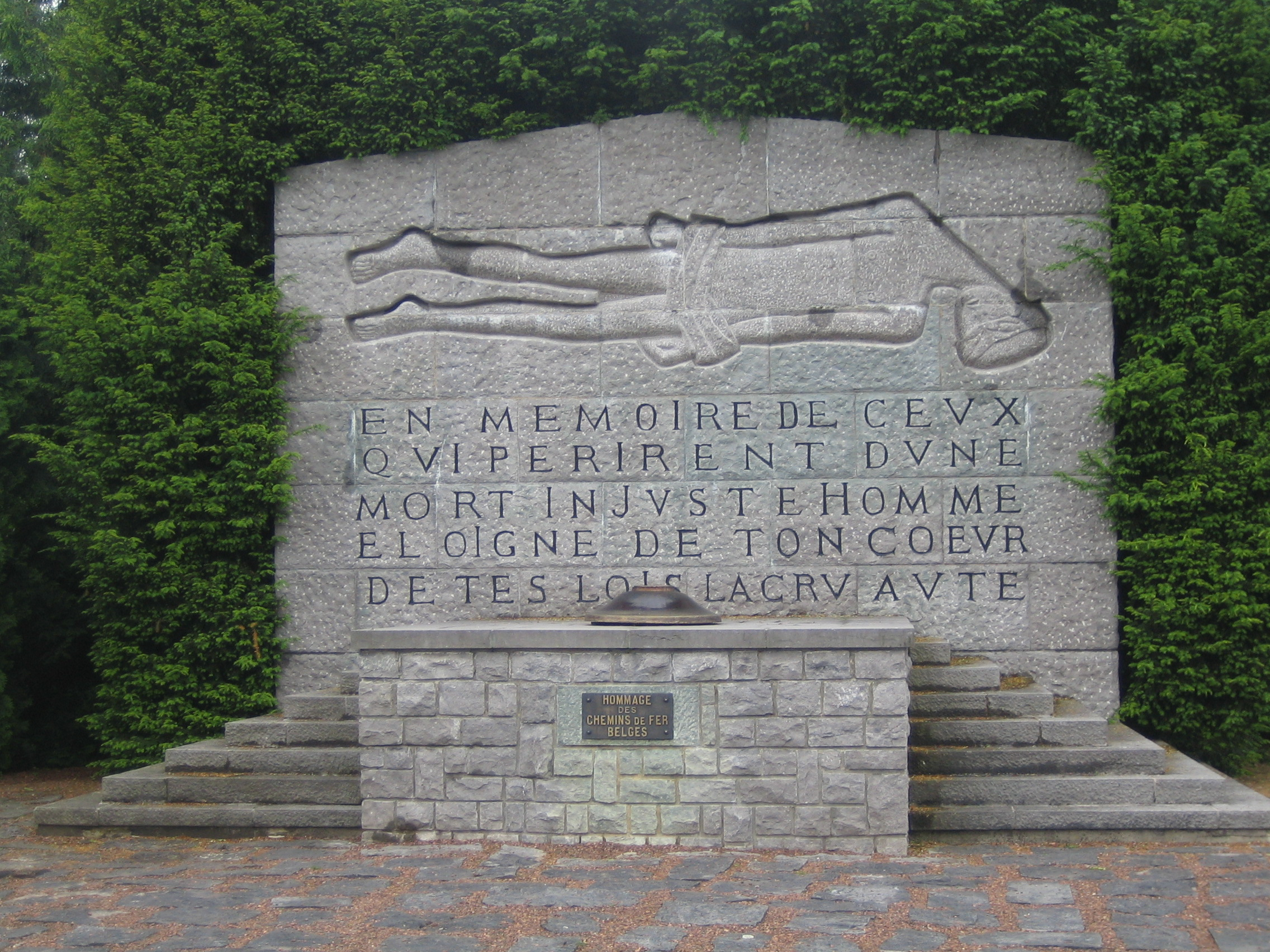
Tertre des massacrés

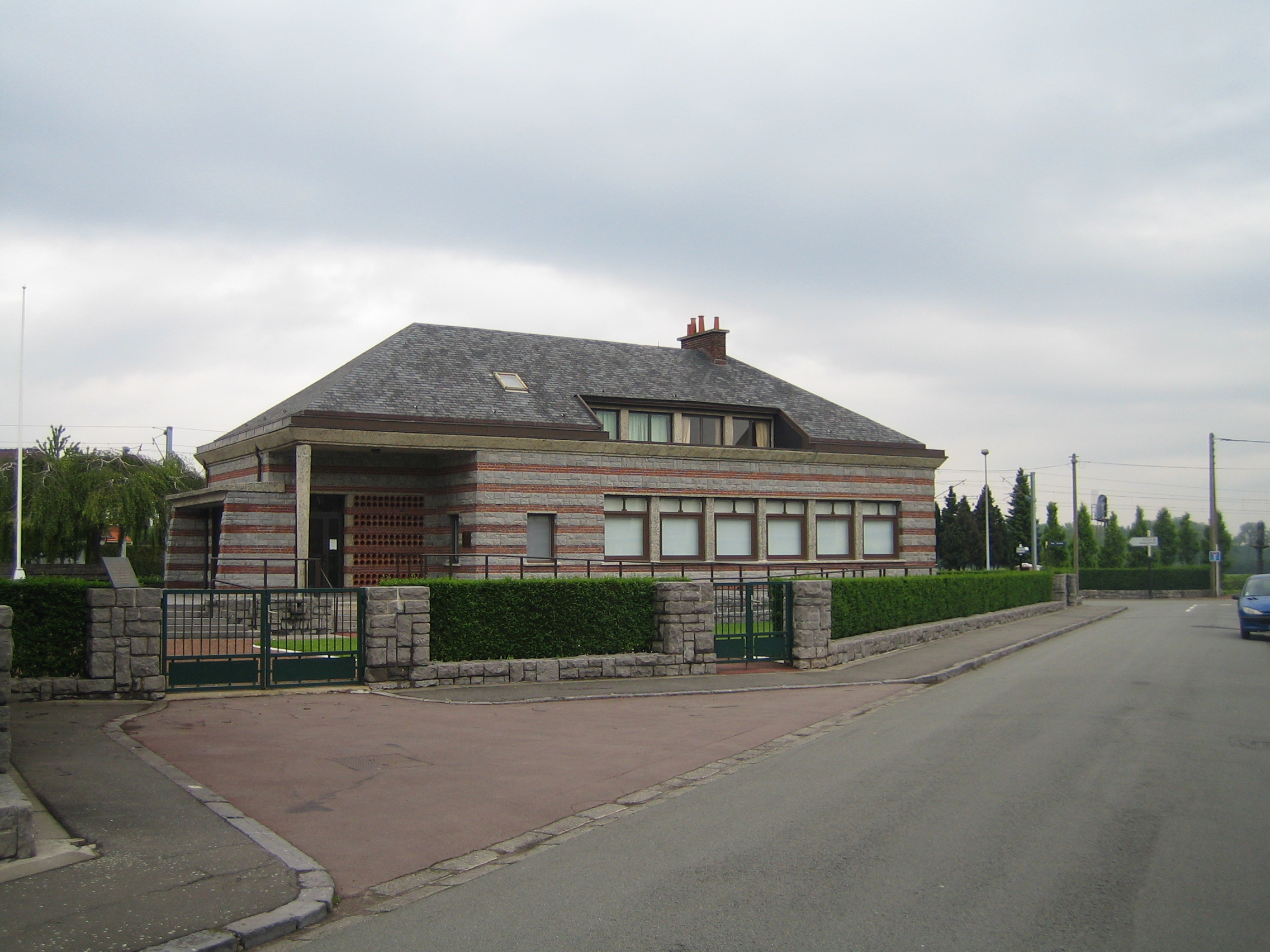
Mémorial Ascq 1944

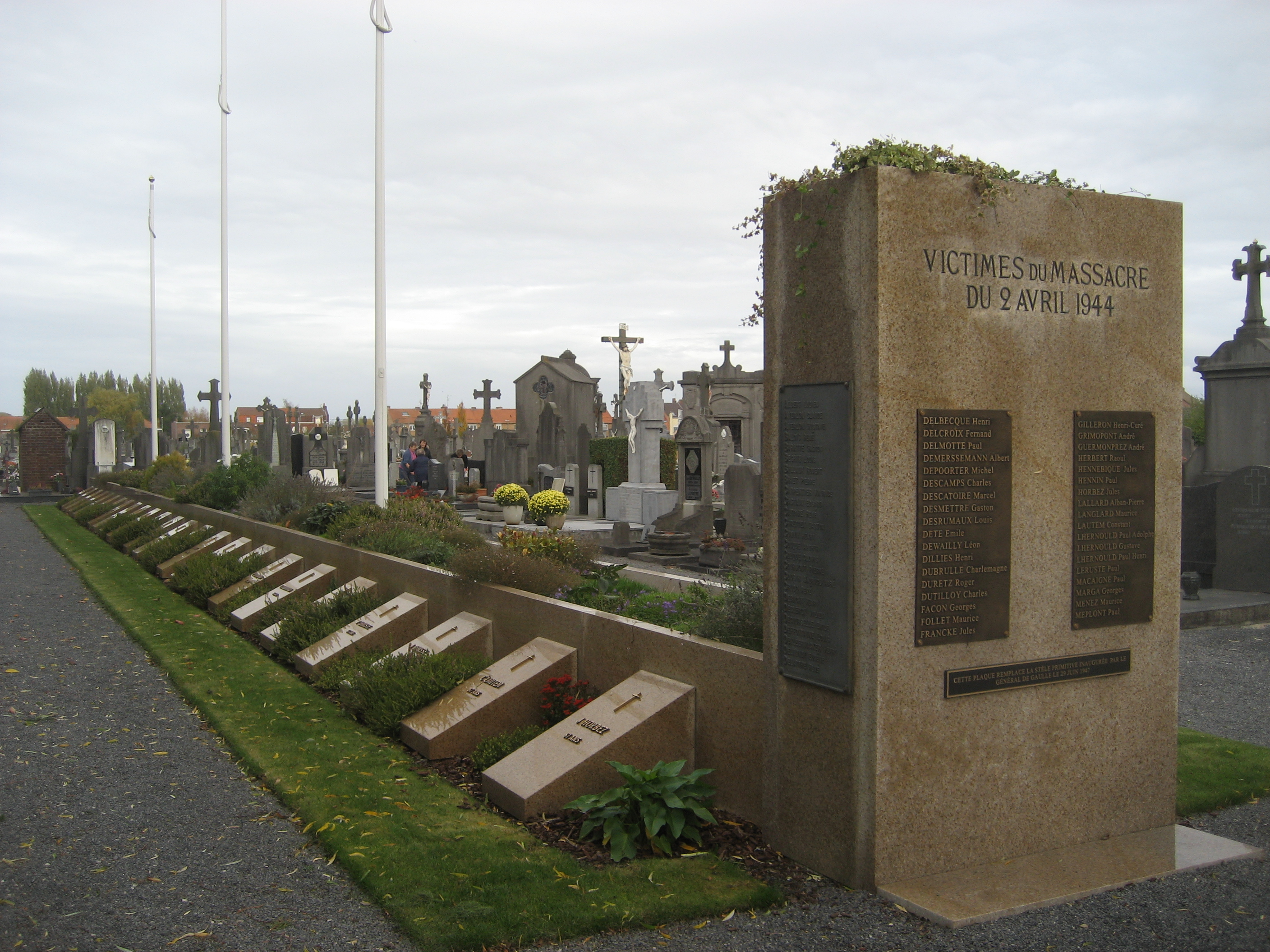
Ascq massacre victims graves, Ascq Communal Cemetery

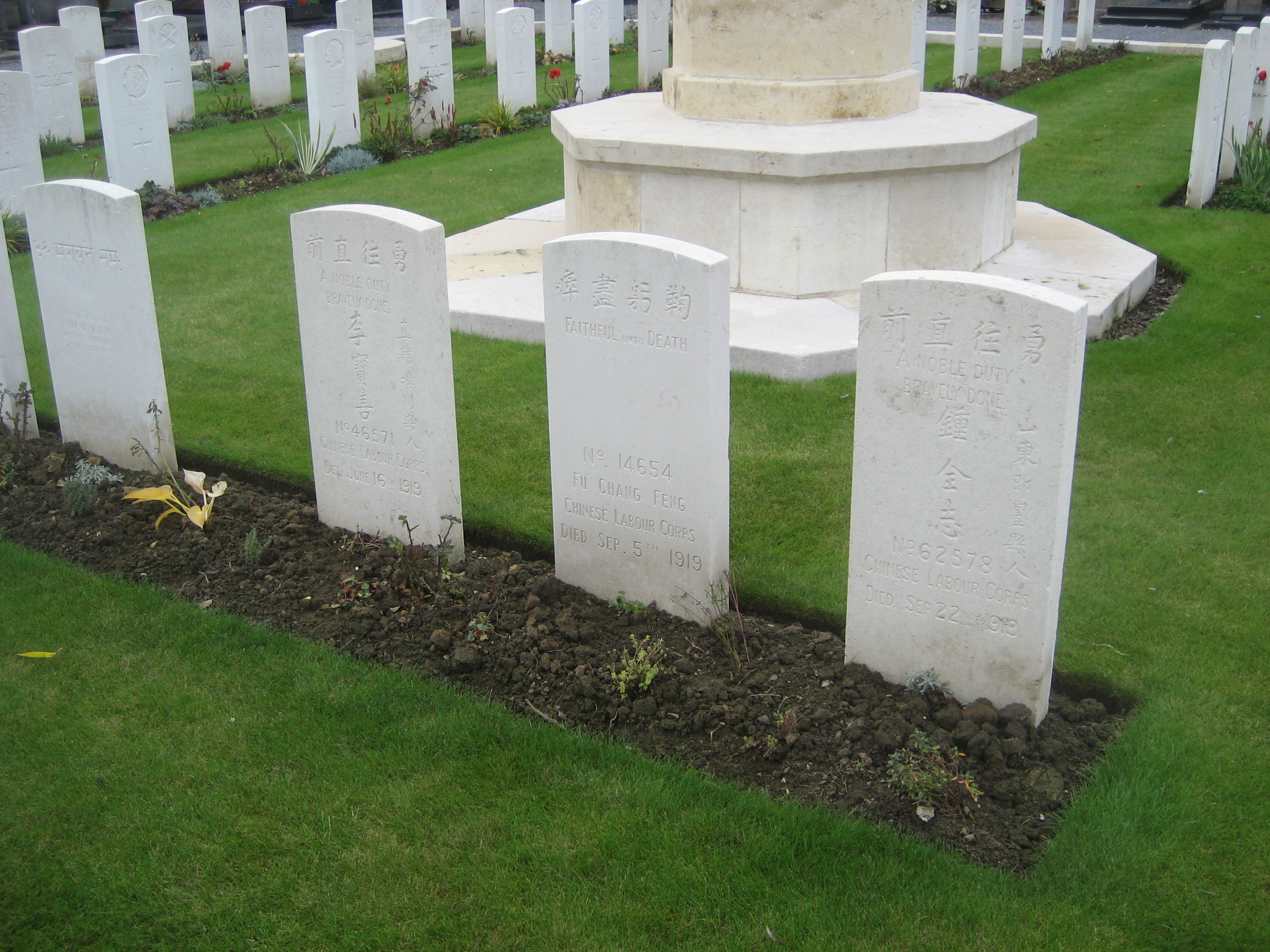
British and Commonwealth war graves, Ascq Communal Cemetery

Other notable buildings are Ascq water tower (20th century) which can be perceived very far away, Arthur Rimbaud collège, the old distillery with its brick chimney, chocolate factory Bouquet d'Or, artisanal brewery Moulins d'Ascq, the old gristmills. Many houses have a remarkable architectural style, such as 1930 seaside style houses in Kléber street.

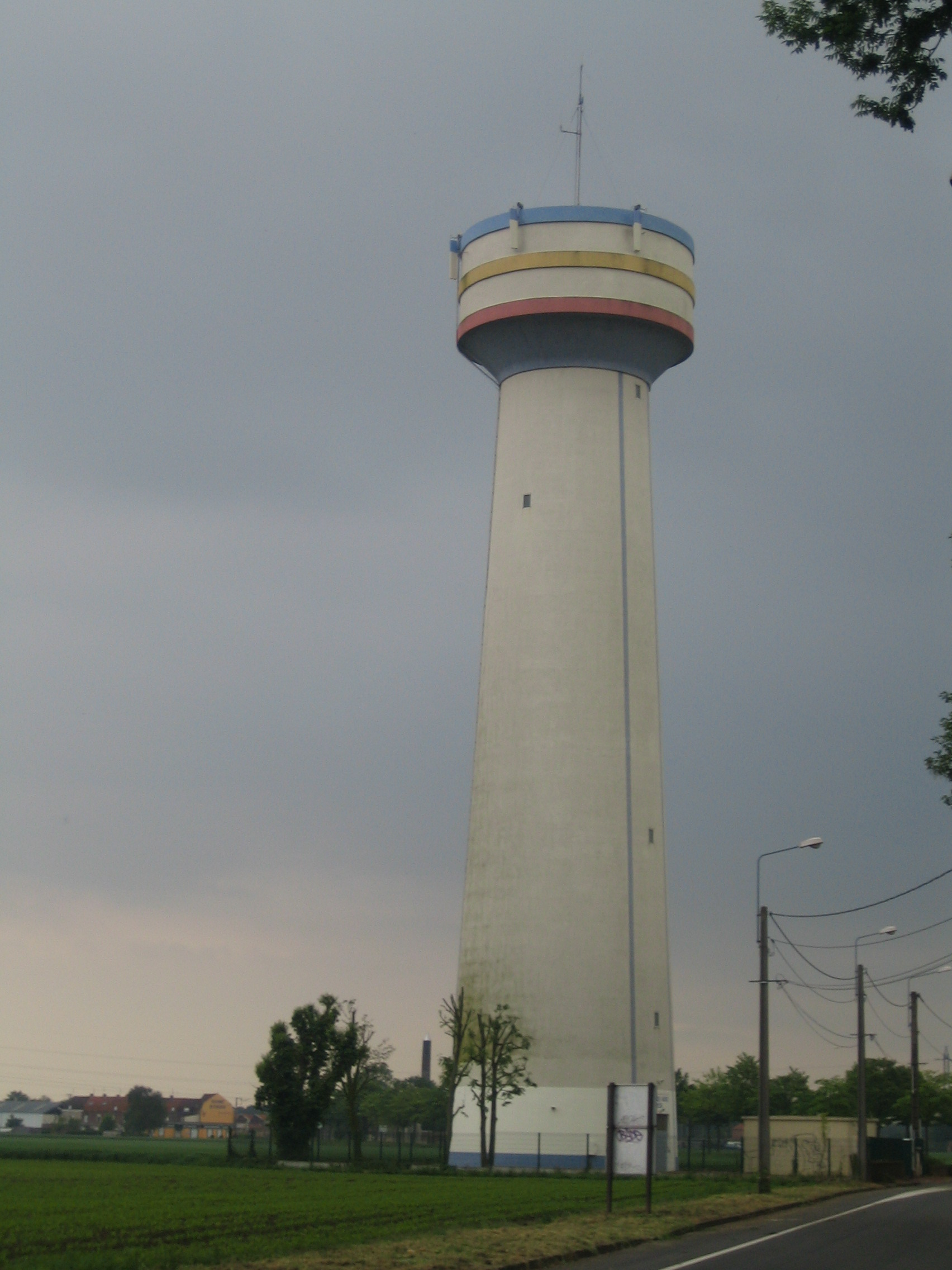
Ascq water tower

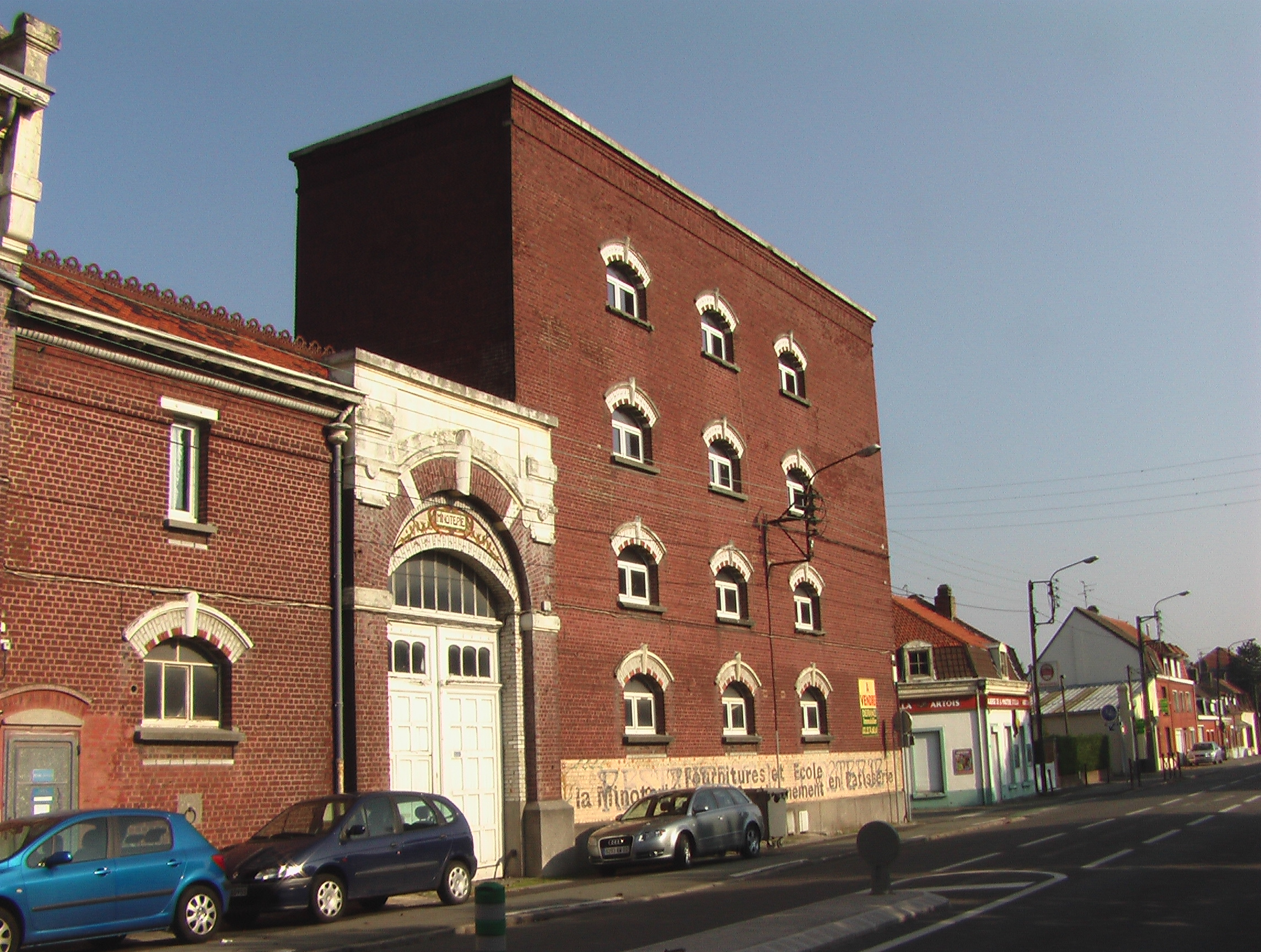
Gristmill in Fusillés street

In the middle of the 20th century, Ascq had a cinéma, 'Le Rex', located salle Potié, church square.

== Transportation ==
- Ascq is served by a rail network of three lines, Lille-Tournai, Lille-Liège and Lille-Orchies of the SNCF and SNCB through the Gare d'Ascq railway station.
- The quarter is served by Transpole with the following bus lines: 43, 47, 305, 314, 330, 331, and 332.

== See also ==
- Communes of the Nord department
