= Leskovice massacre =

Massacre in Czechoslovakia

Coordinates: 49°25′49″N 15°4′49″E

- Part of the German occupation of Czechoslovakia
- Location: Leskovice, Protectorate of Bohemia and Moravia
- Date: 5 May 1945 (81 years ago)
- Deaths: 25
- Perpetrator: Waffen-SS led by Walter Hauck

The Leskovice massacre was the mass murder of twenty-five Czech civilians in May 1945 by Waffen-SS troops on the orders of Nazi officer Walter Hauck inside the village of Leskovice during the World War II.

== Incident ==
On 5 May 1945, Czech partisans in Pelhřimov took refuge in a local forest after they fought a battle with the Germans. Once the Germans had left, they tried to sneak back into town, only for the Schutzstaffel at the lead of Walter Hauck to return at 4:00 AM.

The Nazis surrounded the village, then set fire to the houses as they proceeded to go on a killing spree. German troops decapitated and tortured numerous civilians during the massacre.

According to the testimony of survivor Stanislav Pech:

"They began murdering civilians at the bottom of the village. One family - a husband, his wife and two daughters -- were tied up with wire while their home was set alight. They burned to death. Another person killed was 13-year-old Pepik Vaverka. Usually those who paid the highest price were those who said 'We didn't do anything'."

By the end of the killings, 25 inhabitants of Leskovice were murdered, and 31 houses burned to the ground. General consensus places the massacre's fault at the hands of Walter Hauck.

== Aftermath ==
In 2005, an investigation of the massacre was launched by Czech authorities.

== See also ==
- Ascq massacre, also committed by Hauck
