= Saint-Pierre-en-Antioche Church, Ascq =

Church in Villeneuve-d'Ascq, France

Coordinates: 50°37′10″N 3°09′34″E

Église Saint-Pierre-en-Antioche d'Ascq
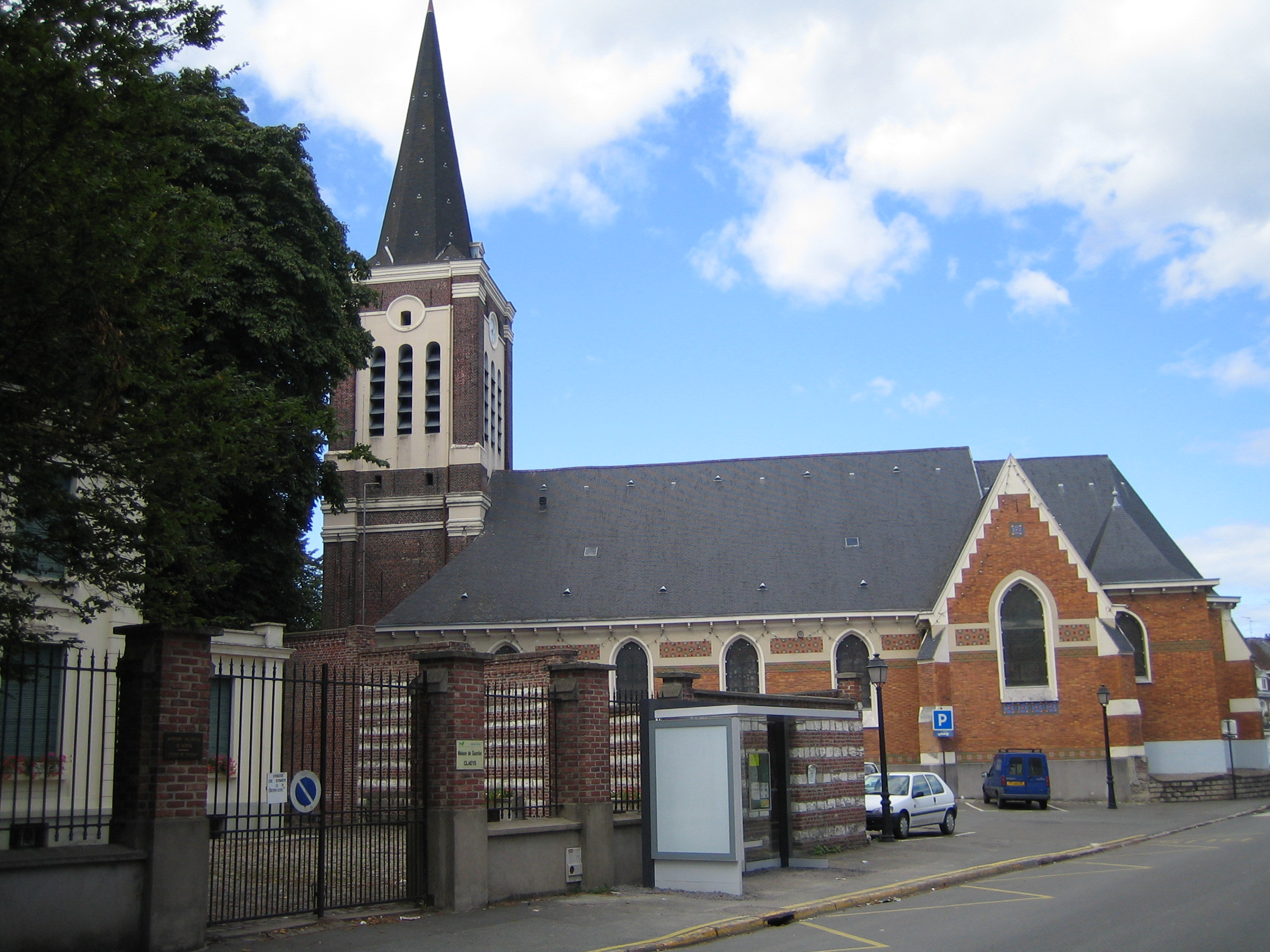
- Saint-Pierre-en-Antioche Church

Religion
- Affiliation: Catholicism
- District: Catholic diocese of Lille
- Region: Nord-Pas-de-Calais
- Status: Active

Location
- Location: Ascq, 59493 Villeneuve d'Ascq, France
- Interactive map of Église Saint-Pierre-en-Antioche d'Ascq

Architecture
- Type: Church
- Style: Flemish
- Groundbreaking: 15th century; 19th century
- Completed: 1842; 1932

Saint-Pierre-en-Antioche Church is a Catholic church located in the village of Ascq, now part of the commune of Villeneuve-d'Ascq, Nord department, northern France.

The church contains a tapestry designated as a monument historique in 1906, called Les Noces de Cana (Marriage at Cana), painted by A. Werniers in 1735. It was originally part of a collection of six pieces for Saint Sauveur church.
