= Ascq station =

Railway station in Ascq, France

Coordinates: 50°37′19″N 3°9′36″E

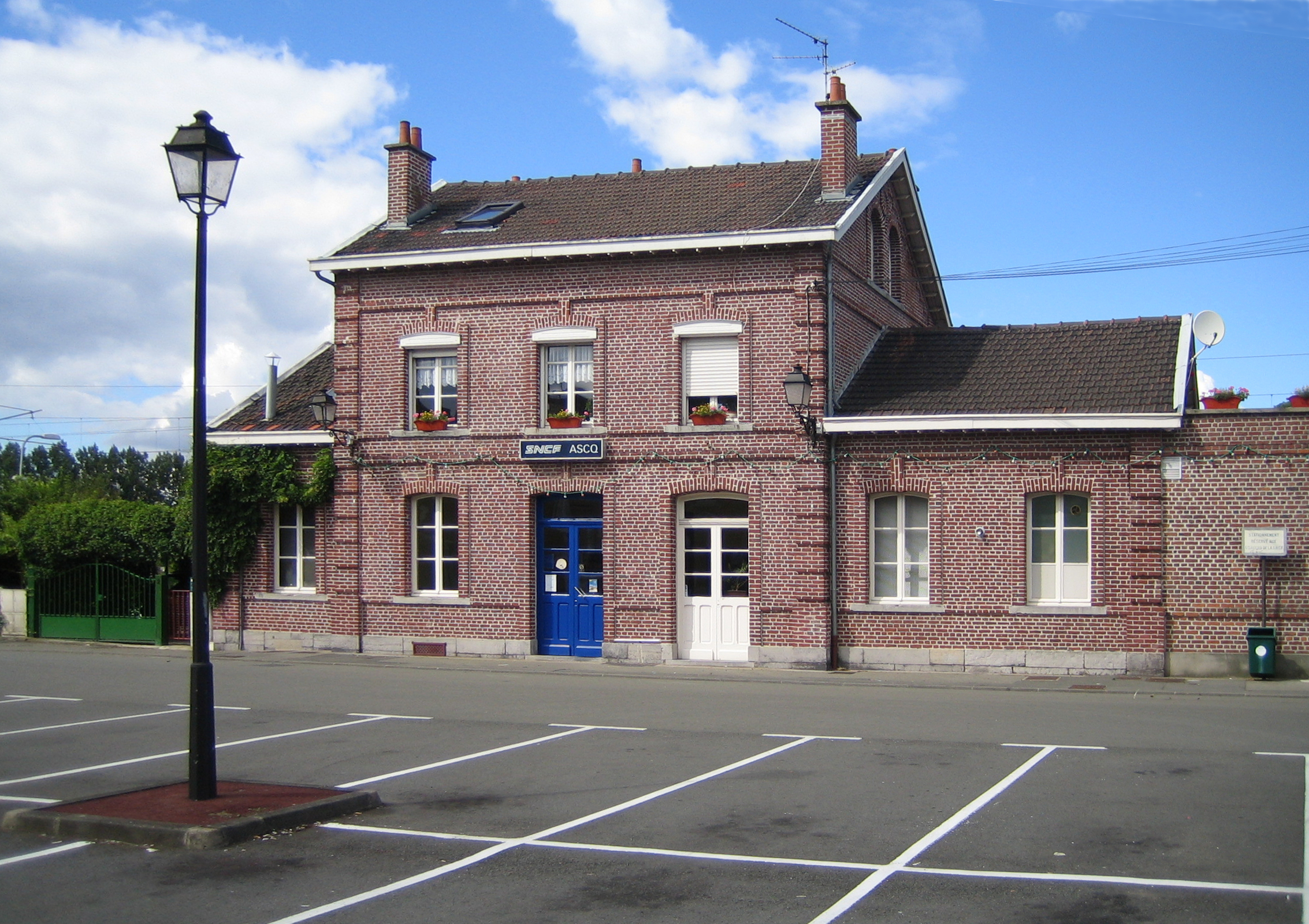
Ascq station

Ascq station (French: Gare d'Ascq) is a railway station serving the former village of Ascq, now part of Villeneuve-d'Ascq city, Nord department, northern France.

== History ==
In the nineteenth century the Industrial Revolution developed industry in northern France. Ascq was linked to Lille with the construction of the railway station in 1865, and in 1885 to Roubaix.

During the Second World War, numerous trains went through Ascq and members of the resistance regularly committed acts of sabotage. On 1 April 1944, after such an act of sabotage, the Nazis killed 86 men. This event is known as the Ascq massacre.

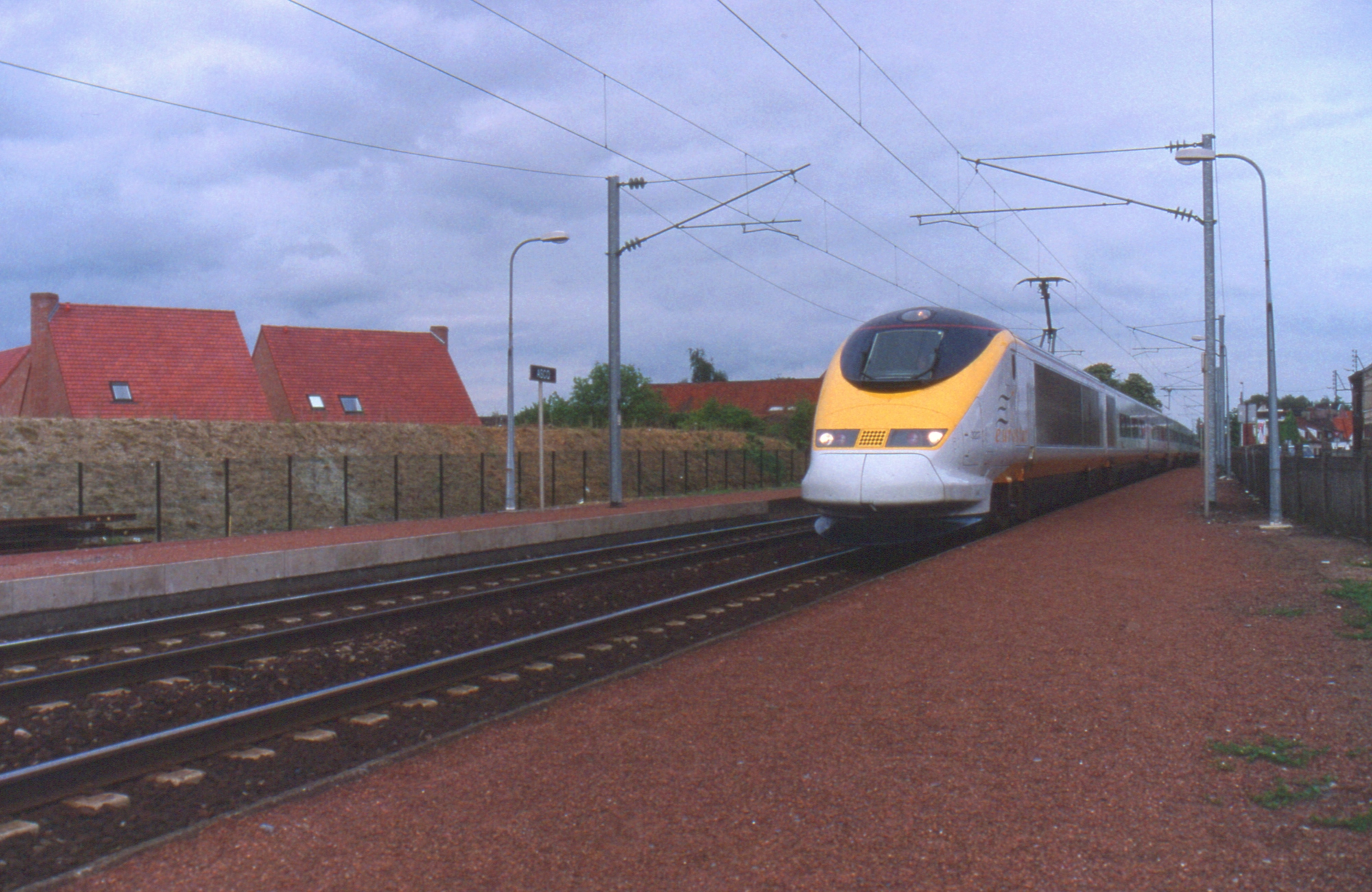
Brussels-London Eurostar in Ascq

In the late 1990s, before the construction of a new Belgian high-speed railway line, Eurostar and Thalys trains going to Belgium went through Ascq station.

== Services ==
The station is served by regional trains to Lille and Tournai (Belgium), and buses to Orchies. Ilévia bus lines 13 and 73 serve the station.

Preceding station	TER Hauts-de-France	Following station
Annappes towards Lille-Flandres	Proxi P81	Baisieux towards Tournai

== Trains garage ==
The railway station hosts a little train museum in the trains garage (halle aux trains) animated by the AAATV association. It houses a steam locomotive 141 TC 51 and an electric locomotive BB 12004 restored among many other train materials.

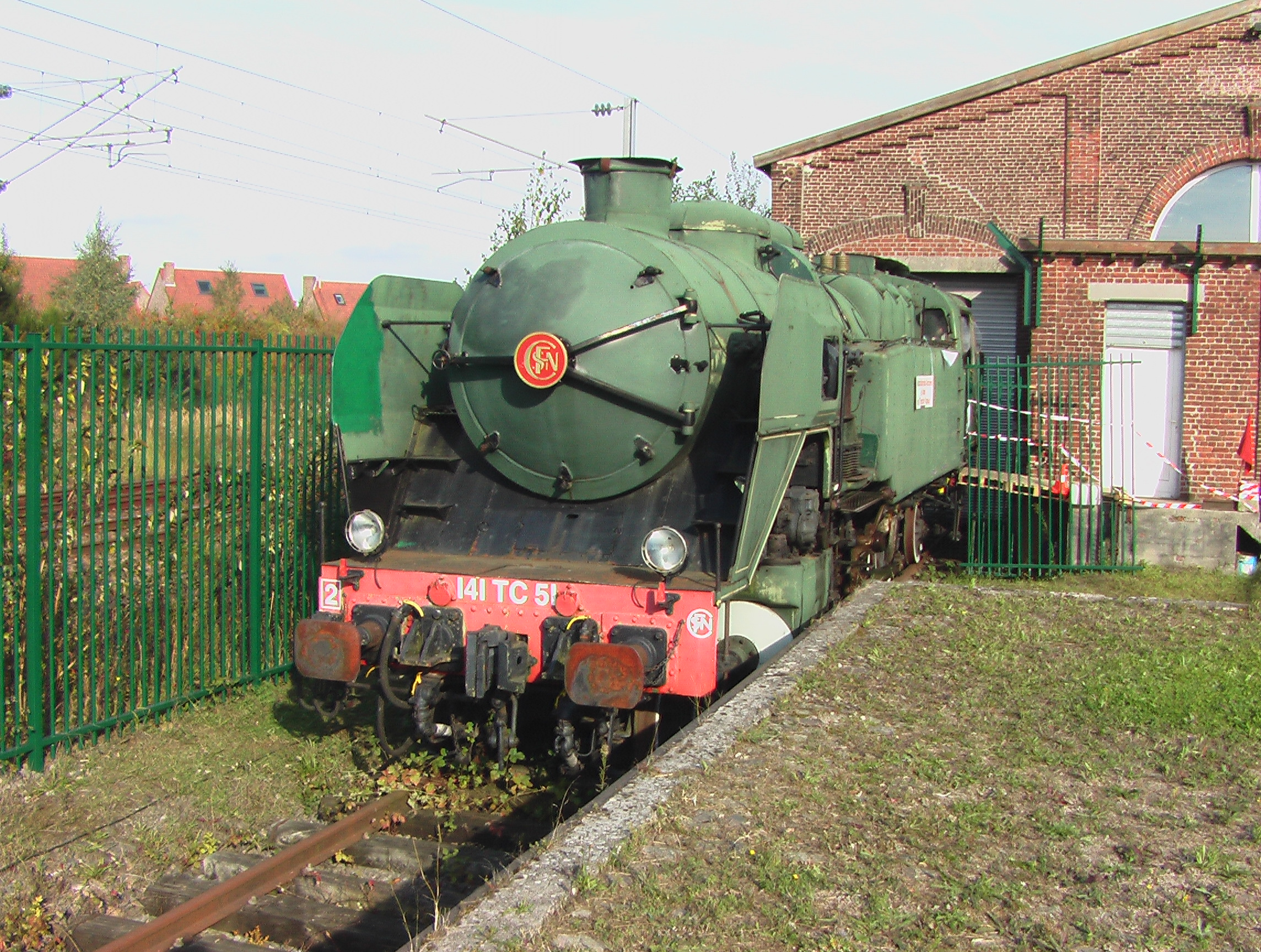
The 141 TC 51

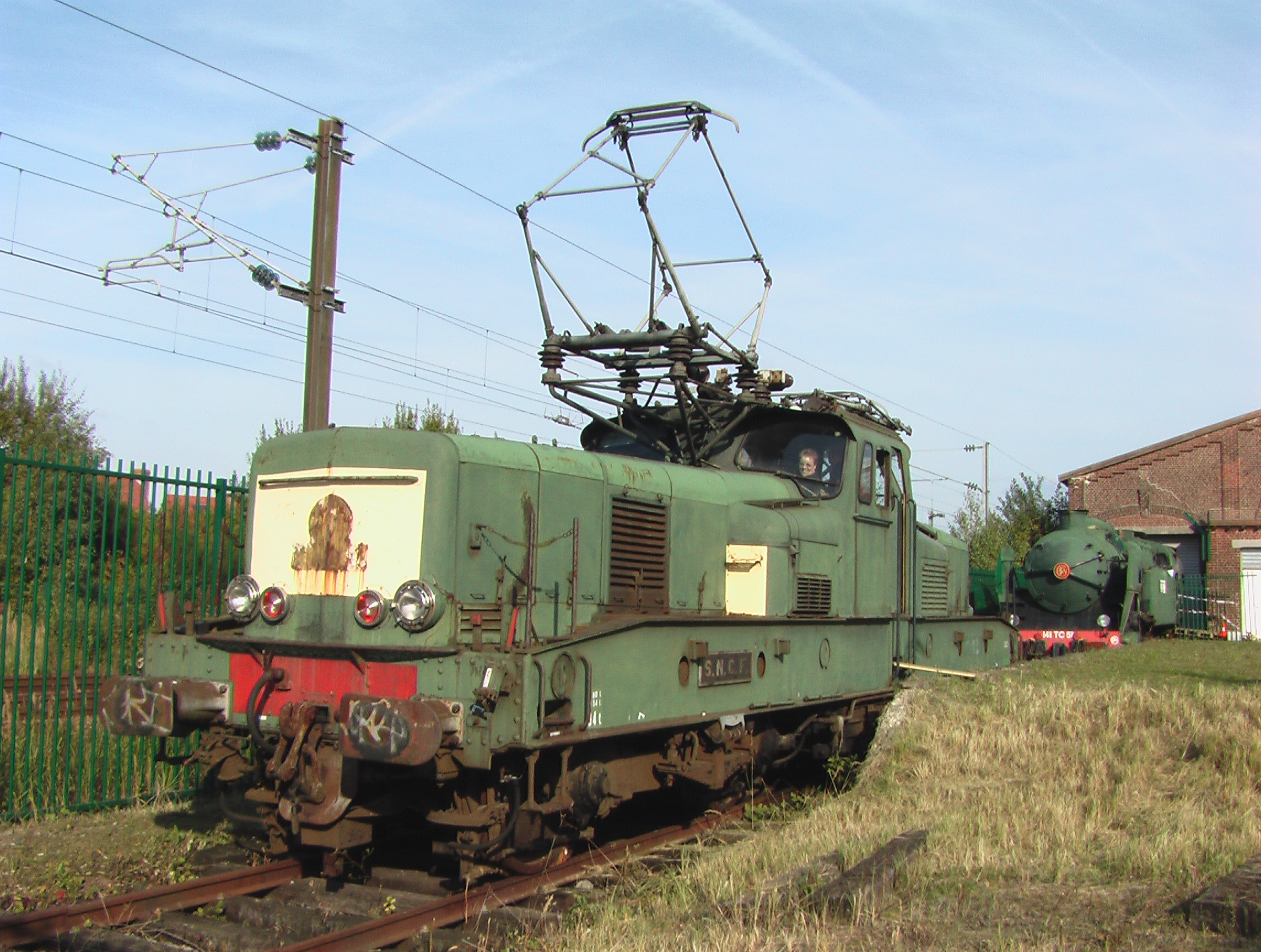
The BB 12004

== Gallery ==
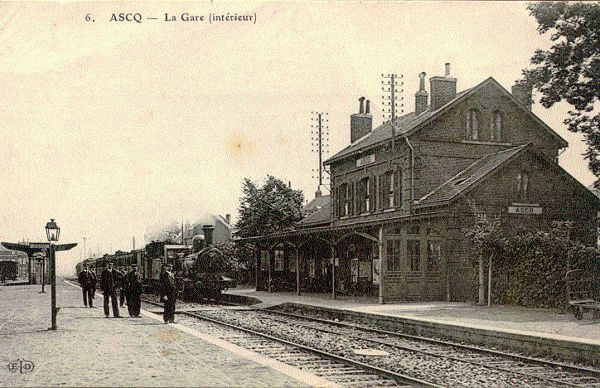
Ascq station, around 1900

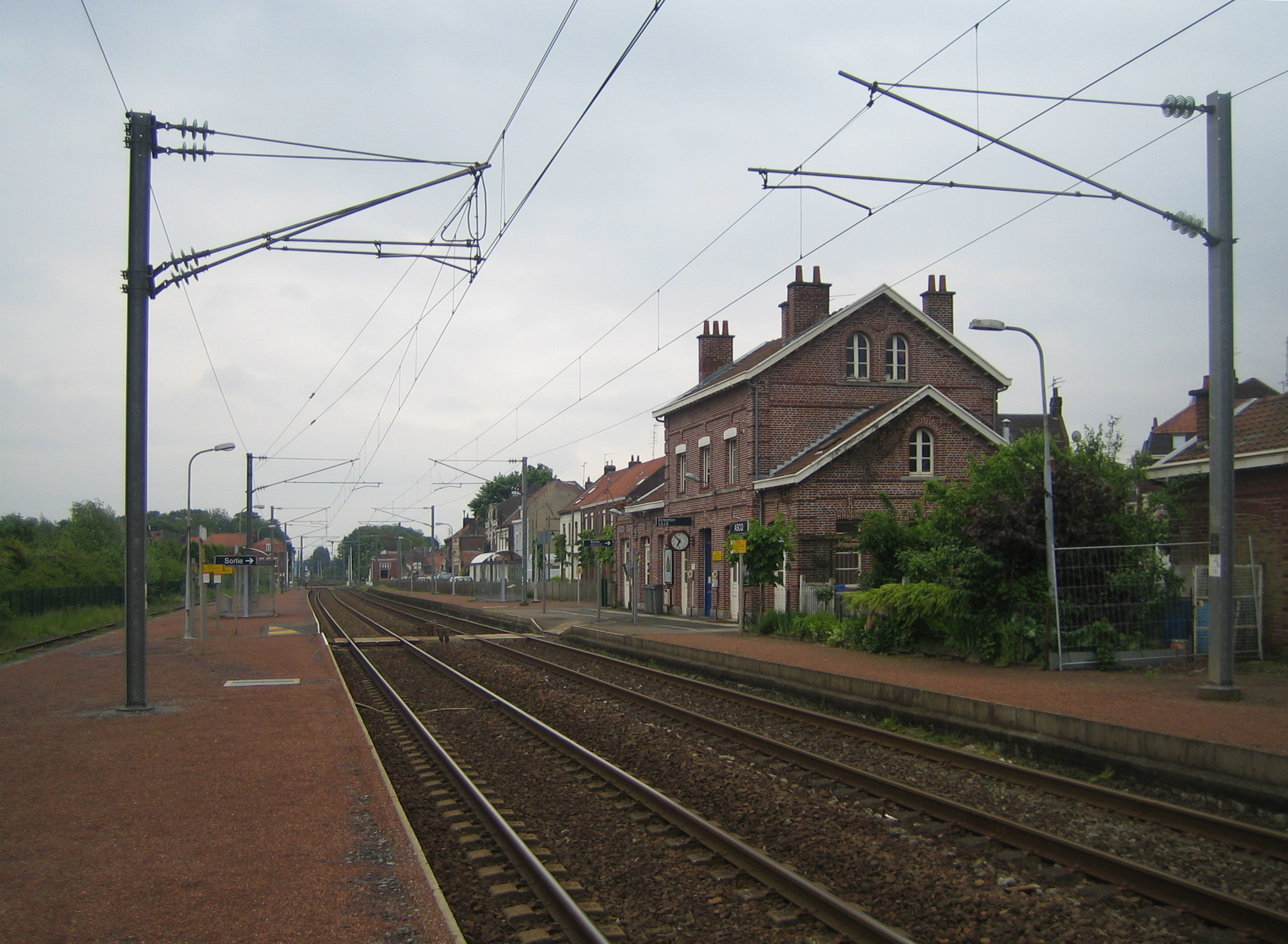
Ascq station, from east

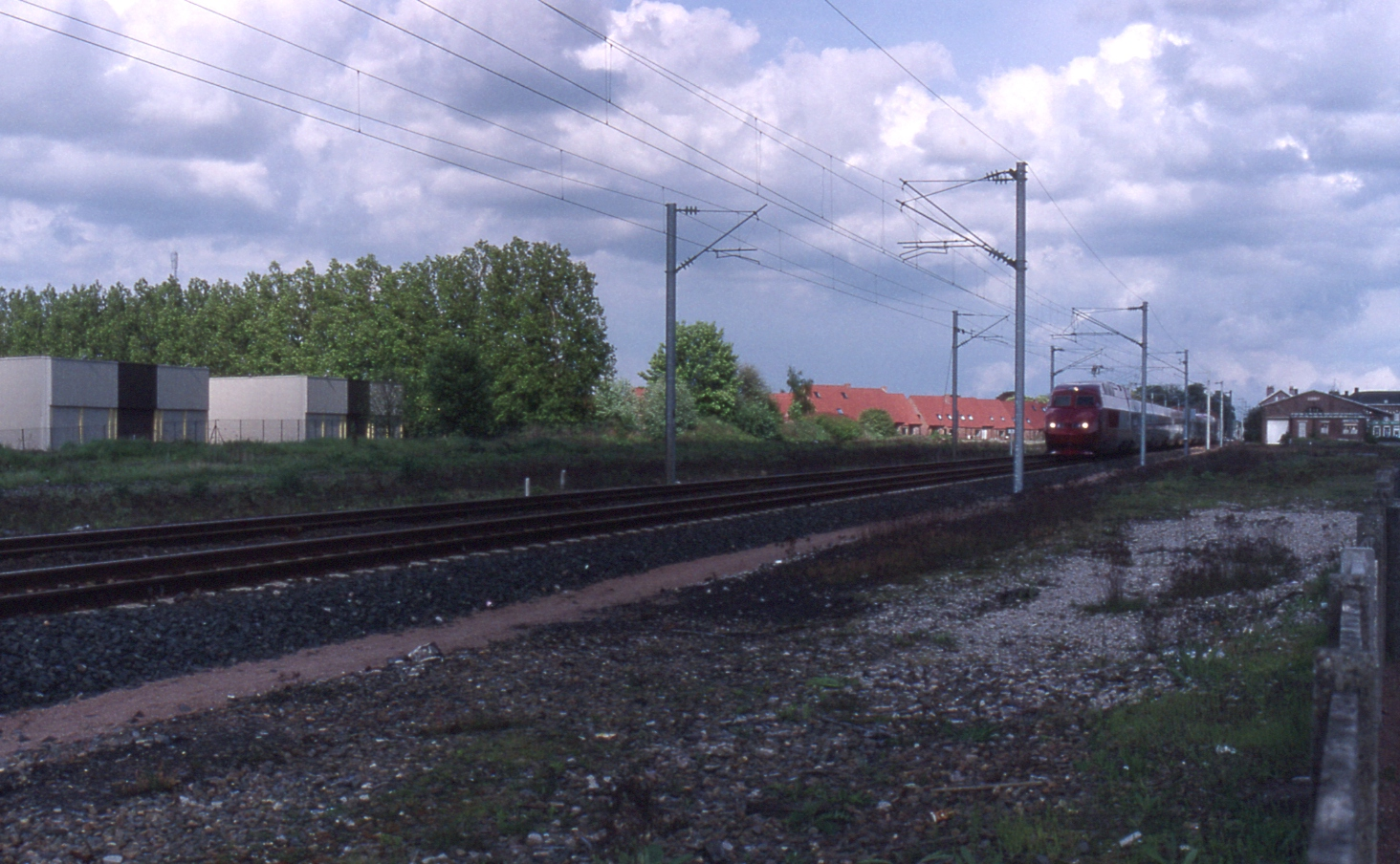
An Amsterdam-Paris thalys goes through the station in 1996

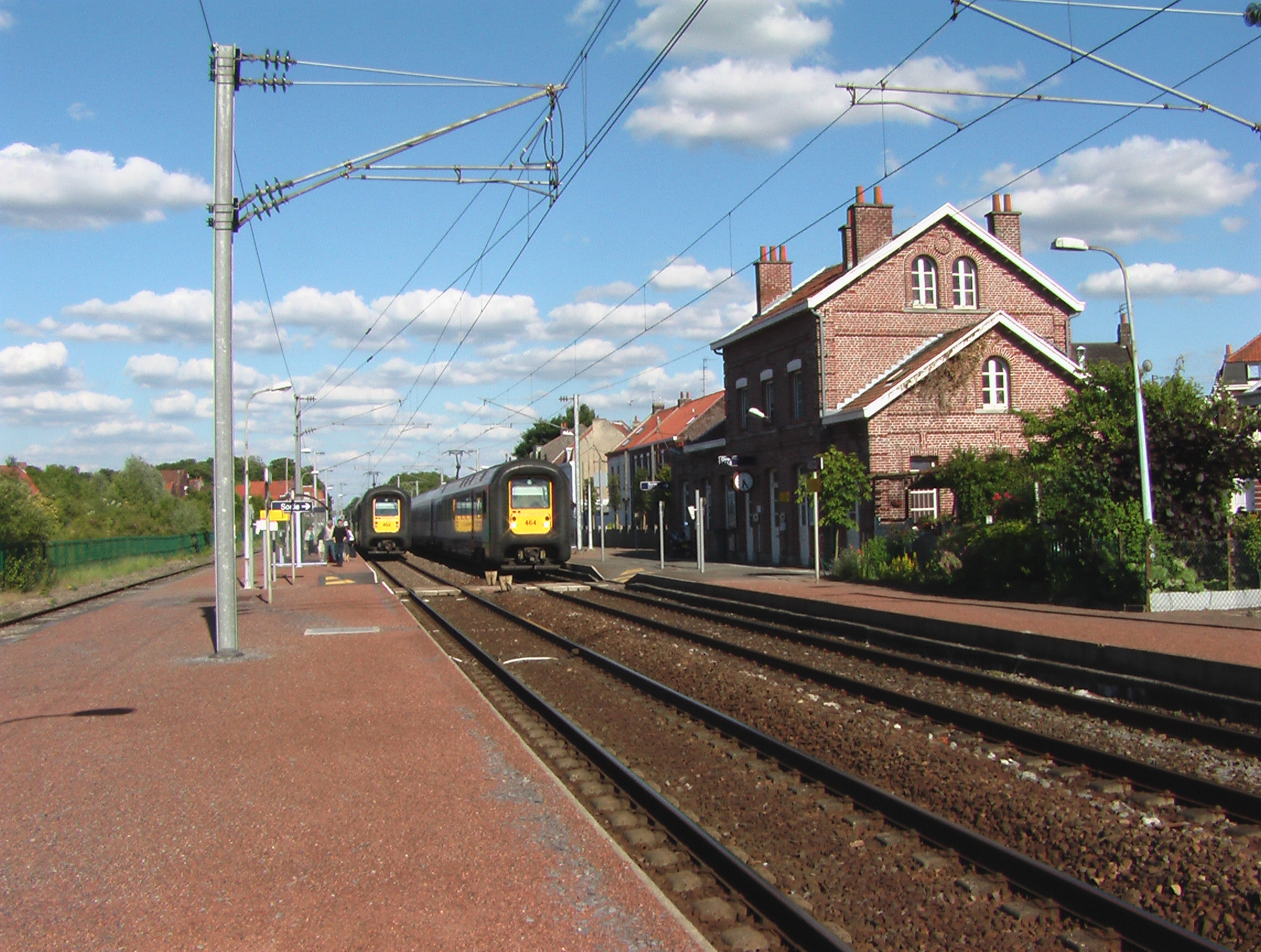
Two Belgian trains in the station

== See also ==
- List of SNCF stations in Hauts-de-France
