= Leskovice =

- Municipality
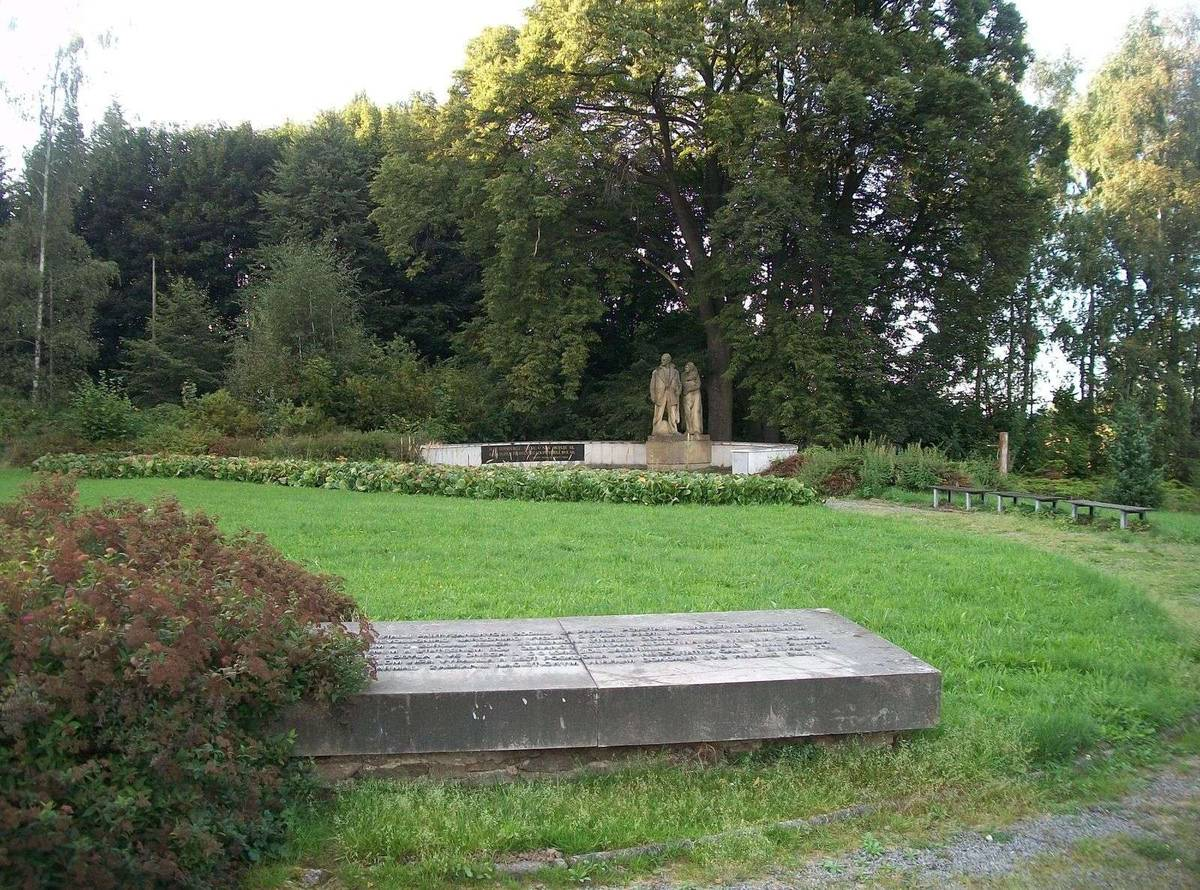
- Memorial of the Leskovice massacre

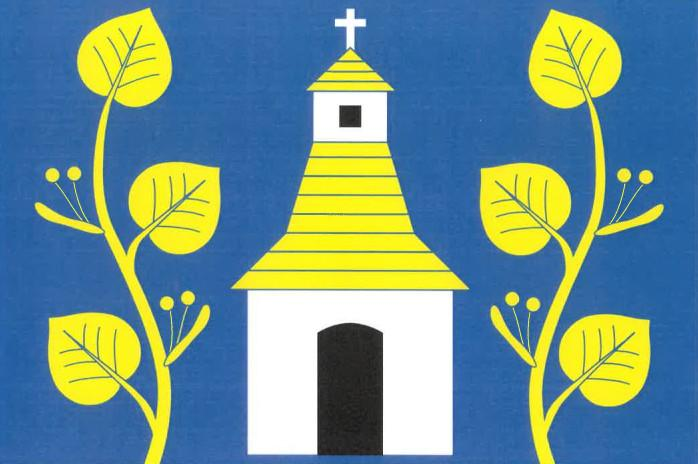
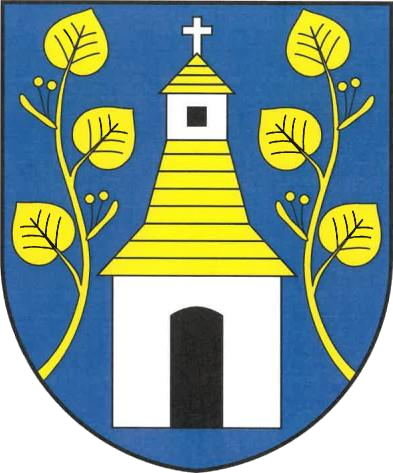
- Flag Coat of arms

- Location in the Czech Republic
- Coordinates: 49°25′48″N 15°4′52″E
- Country: Czech Republic
- Region: Vysočina
- District: Pelhřimov
- First mentioned: 1379

Area
  - Total: 3.50 km^{2} (1.35 sq mi)
- Elevation: 615 m (2,018 ft)

Population (2026-01-01)
  - Total: 120
  - Density: 34/km^{2} (89/sq mi)
- Time zone: UTC+1 (CET)
  - Summer (DST): UTC+2 (CEST)
- Postal code: 394 14
- Website: www.obecleskovice.cz

Leskovice is a municipality and village in Pelhřimov District in the Vysočina Region of the Czech Republic. It has about 100 inhabitants.

Leskovice lies approximately 10 kilometres (6 mi) west of Pelhřimov, 37 km (23 mi) west of Jihlava, and 88 km (55 mi) south-east of Prague.

== History ==
The first written mention of Leskovice is from 1379. In 1945, the mass murder of 25 Czech civilians known as the Leskovice massacre took place here.

== Demographics ==
Historical population
Year	Pop.	±%
1869	184	—
1880	221	+20.1%
1890	237	+7.2%
1900	257	+8.4%
1910	237	−7.8%
1921	256	+8.0%
1930	242	−5.5%
1950	166	−31.4%
1961	216	+30.1%
1970	183	−15.3%
1980	151	−17.5%
1991	101	−33.1%
2001	96	−5.0%
2011	89	−7.3%
2021	100	+12.4%
Source: Censuses
