= Snow barrier =

There are multiple types of snow barriers, sometimes known as snow-supporting structures, in use to lessen the damaging impact that snow can have on human development:

- Avalanche net, a netting designed to slow the motion of snow and prevent avalanches
- Avalanche control § Snow bridge
- Snow shed, a structure designed to collect snow on top, allowing people to pass safely below. Frequently used in mountainous areas
- Snow fence, a fencing designed to cause snow drifts down wind, so the snow drifts don't instead happen in an undesired area
- Snow guard, a barrier installed on roofs to prevent snow and ice from falling on people below.

== See also ==
- Snow bridge, a natural feature
- Avalanche control
