= Roof seamer =

Machine that installs standing-seam metal roof panels

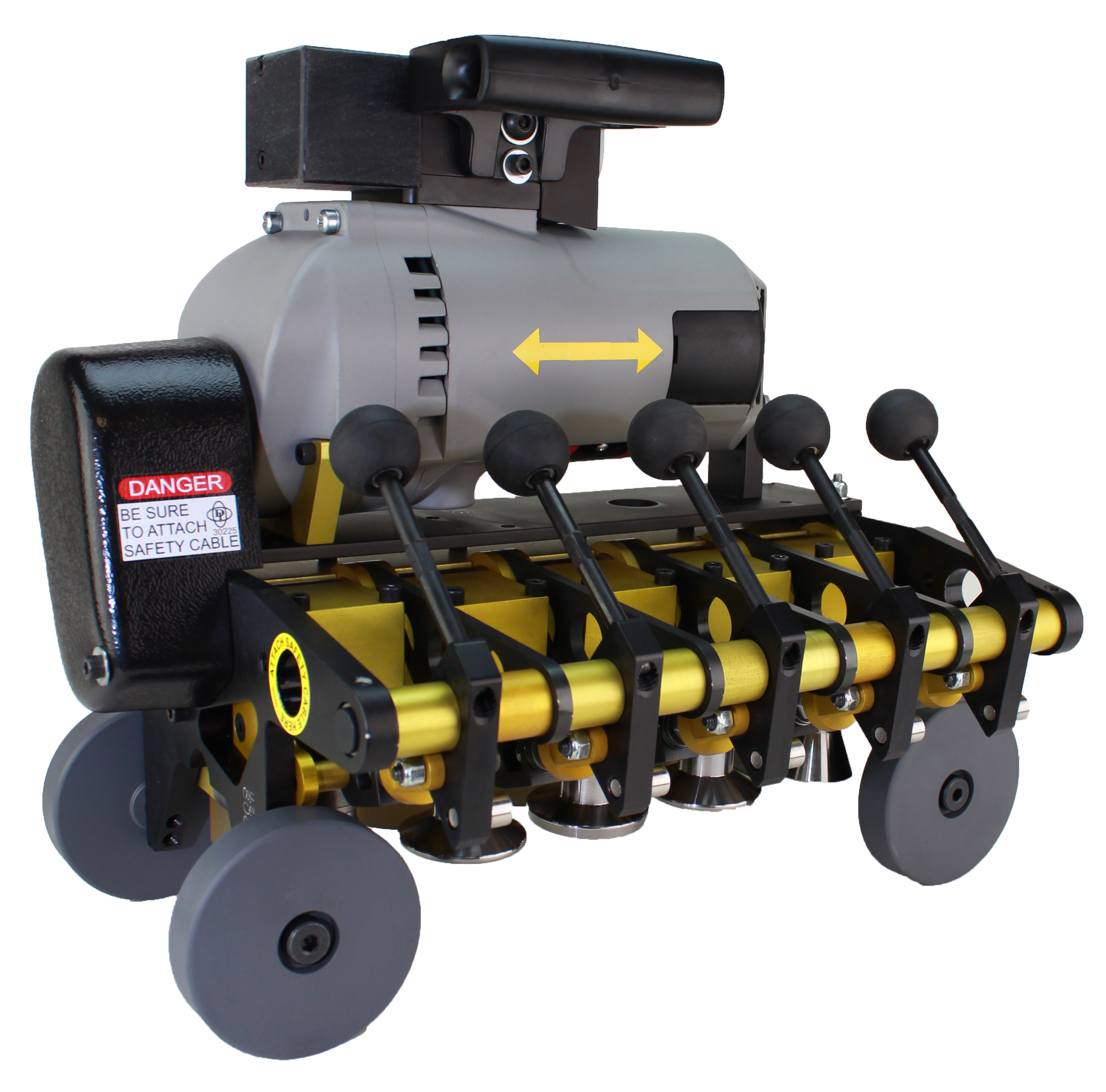
This roof seamer uses 5 sets of rolling forming dies to manipulate the metal roof panel at the "seam" where two panels meet.

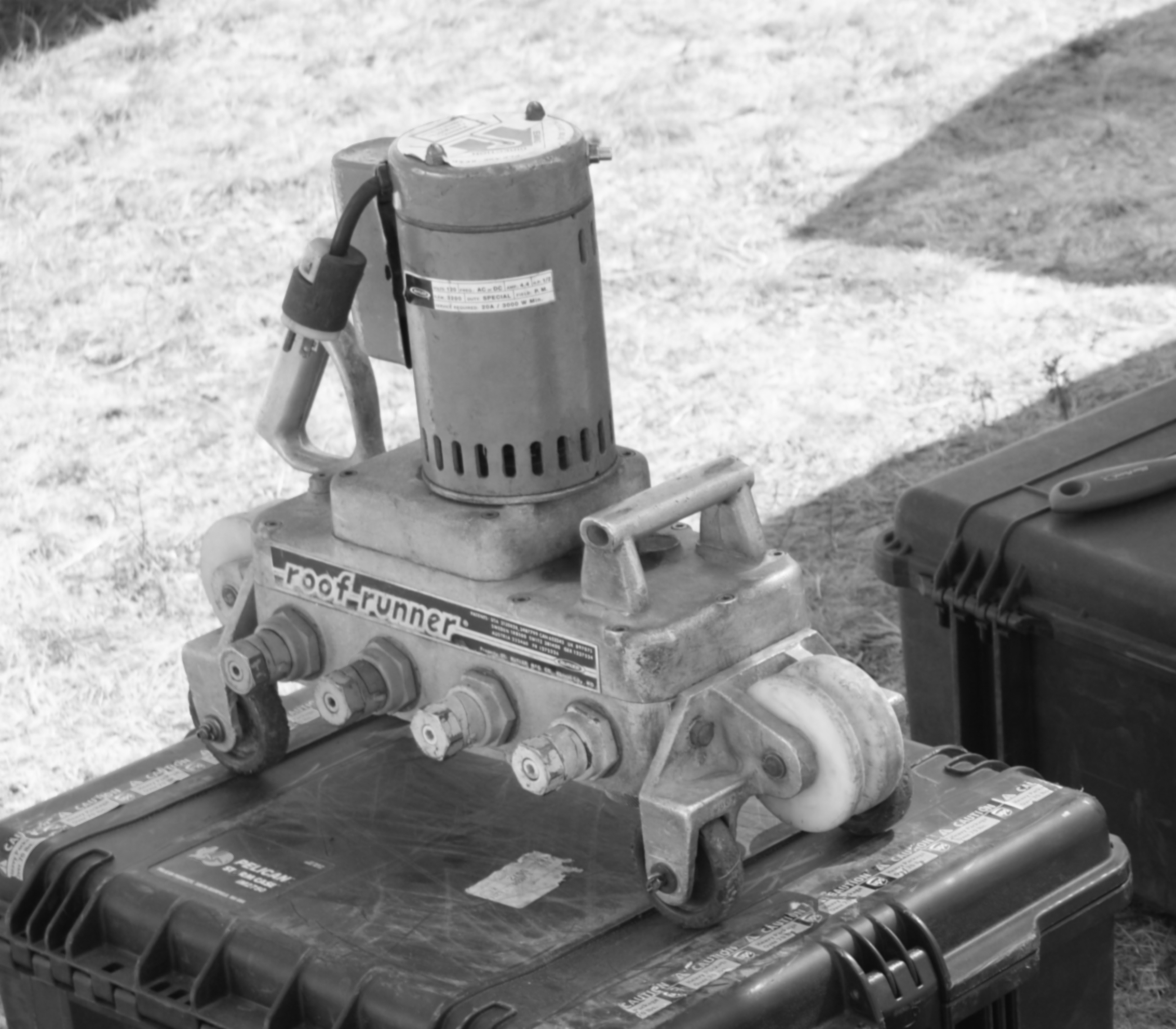
The Roof Runner® machine, manufactured in Sweden, was introduced by Butler Manufacturing for the MR-24® roof system.

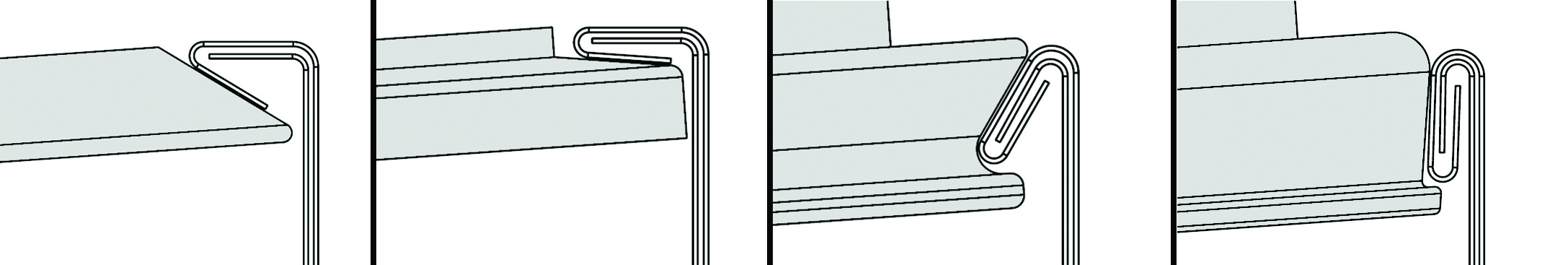
Progressive roller dies of the roof seamer are used to bend the metal roof panel seam into the desired shape to produce a finished seam profile. This shows a cross-section profile of the seam.

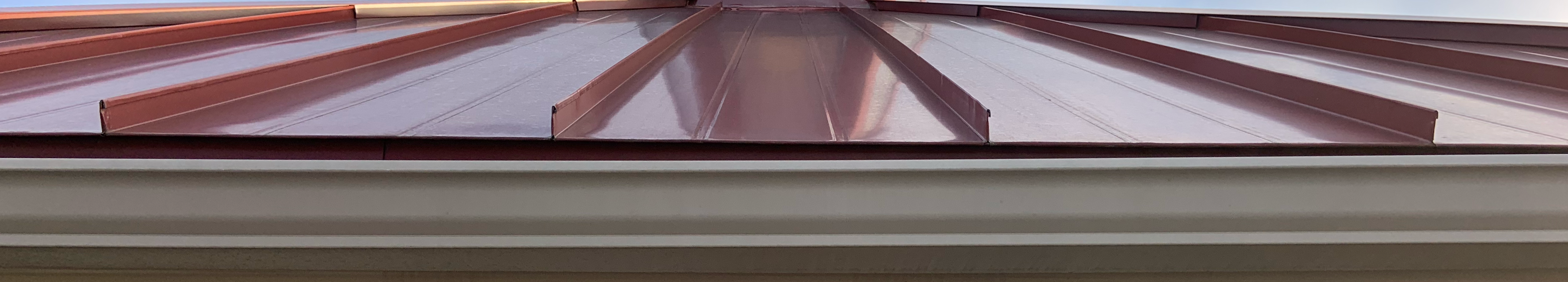
Mechanically seamed standing seams (double locked)

A roof seamer is a portable roll forming machine that is used to install mechanically seamed structural standing-seam metal roof panels, as part of an overall metal construction building envelope system. The machine is small and portable to be handled by an operator on top of a roof. The machine is applied to the overlapping area when two parallel roof panels meet. The action of the machine bends the two panels together to form a joint that has weather-tight qualities superior to other types of roof systems and cladding.

== History ==
Commonly, a roof seamer is developed as an afterthought. Since roof seamers are dependent on the metal roof system being used, their development was secondary to the roof panel. A roof seamer is a development that replaced a manual process and hand tools of the past. A hammer and small anvil were tools that were used for hemming and seaming roof panels together at the edge where they meet with the next roof panel in sequence.

In 1976, a German immigrant and inventor, Ewald Stellrecht, helped develop an early version of a metal roof panel portable roll forming machine in Exton, PA. From this a version of the roof seamer was also created. Since that time, great strides and innovations have been made in the development of roof seaming machines. Also, in the 1970s, Butler Manufacturing developed and released a proprietary roof system that featured the use of an electric roof seamer, dubbed the Roof Runner®, along with hand tools and an operating platform. Many developments have been made since that time to make roof seamers lighter, faster, and more user-friendly. In 1989, Developmental Industries refocused the niche market by developing a line of roof seamers that were universal to many different panel manufacturers' products and were available to rent by the end user. Traditionally, purchasing a roof seamer meant that it would work with one specific roof panel, manufactured by a specific roof panel manufacturer. By opening up builders and installers to the option of renting, this allowed them to have the option of buying from different sources and greatly reducing their cost, making metal roofing a more accessible option for many that would not consider it before.

== Design and function ==
Today roof seamers are used around the world. As the rise in popularity in sustainable building products has risen in recent years, the need of a roof seaming tool has also increased. Most roof seaming machines can have a life expectancy of 20 or more years, if proper maintenance and care are exercised.

=== Variables ===
Many variables exist when using a roof seamer that may affect the final product outcome. All of the following variables should be considered and decided on during the design process of the building:

- Material: Metal roof panels are made from a variety of materials including coated carbon steel, aluminum, zinc, and copper. The type and strength of the material must be considered, not only for tensile strength but also flexural strength. The quality of materials should be considered based on the mill and country it was sourced from. Most often these materials come to the panel manufacturer in the form of a coil, then fed into a roll forming machine to produce the finished roof panel shape and dimension.
- Material Coating: A coating can be layers of other metals (material treated through the process of galvanization), paint, or extruded coatings.
- Thickness: Different gauges of metal will present a range of thicknesses that must be accounted for with the forming dies of the roof seaming machine. This, in addition to the thickness of the coating, should be factored in to produce an acceptable seamed profile, but not to compromise the coating.
- Geography: The particular location of the structure will play into its performance over time. Weather patterns, temperature ranges, and prolonged exposure to the elements can affect the thermal movement of the metal roof panels.
- Structural load: Many things can produce "load" on a roof. The most common that will be combated by the roof seamer are considered environmental loads, such as wind, snow, rain, and seismic considerations.
- Sealants: Sealants are almost always used inside of the panel lapped seams. These sealants can be applied in a factory setting or at the construction site. In either case, liquid caulk sealant and butyl tapes are the most common. In either case, the amount, location, and application method are specified to cause maximum protection for the building system as a whole.
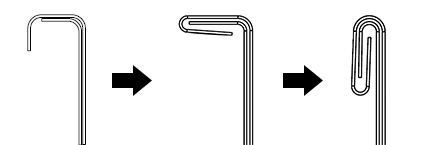
  This shows an unseamed metal roof panel lap and two common options for a finished seam profile that a roof seamer can produce.
- Desired results: The "finished seam profile" can be specified by a roof panel manufacturer as an option for the architectural designer to consider. Factors that can affect the desired results would be aesthetic appearance and environmental loads.
- Roof Pitch: A roof's pitch is simply the angle of the roof. This will create resistance for the roof seamer to overcome. The steeper the pitch, the greater the roof seamer may have to work to ascend and descend the roof panels.
- Fastening method: Mechanically seamed standing seam roof systems use a hidden fastener system. This system consists of a "clip" that is fabricated out of metal and attached to the structure's substrate with screws. When the panels are installed over these clips, they will be hidden from view and formed into the seam of the panels with the roof seamer. This prevents penetrations from fasteners and screws through the metal roof panel that would be used to secure them to the structure with other types of metal roofs.
- Ancillary Attachments: Roof-mounted HVAC, solar panels, snow guards, and many other products are often attached to standing seam metal roofs. This additional load, attachment methods and the use of dissimilar materials must be considered. Specifically the use of other materials to prevent galvanic corrosion and premature compromise and degradation of the materials.

=== Power and usage ===
Traditionally, roof seamers are powered by electricity-driven motors. Depending on the operator's location, either 120-volt or 240-volt power may be required. On most construction sites, either temporary electrical power is supplied or power is offered by an electric generator. This gives the operator the flexibility to take the power source onto a roof with them instead of using extensions cords, which can depreciate the power supply and possibly damage the motor of the roof seamer.

=== Training ===
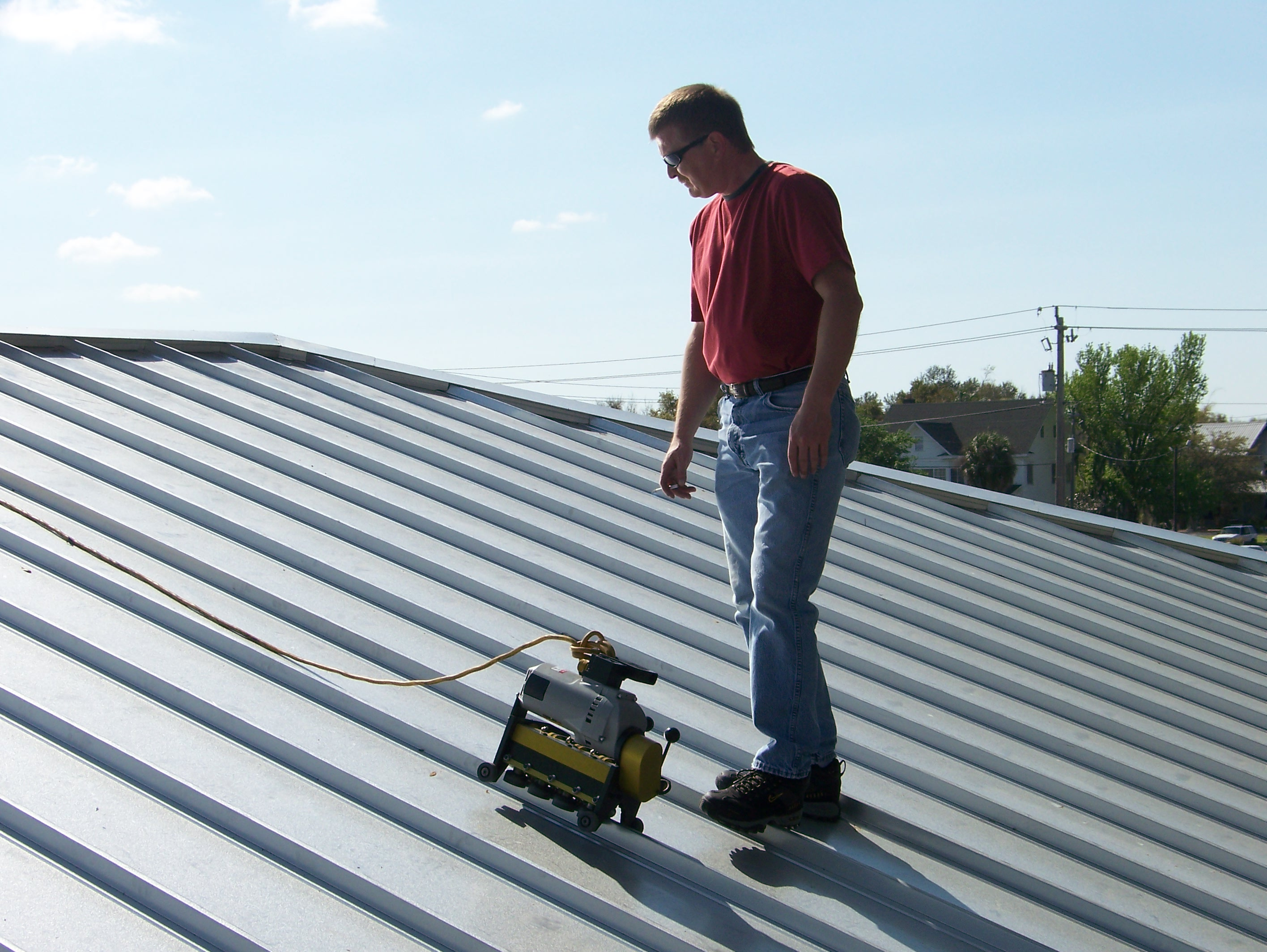
An operator monitors an electric roof seamer as it travels along a metal roof seam.

While simple in concept, effective use of a roof seamer requires a trained operator. Practical training is especially useful for on-site troubleshooting. Classroom or hands-on instruction can teach operation, but on-the-job training is considered most effective. Manuals, videos, and field guides can also support learning. In any case, training should be completed before operating a roof seamer alone to cover preventive maintenance, basic adjustments, and troubleshooting.

In 2015, the Metal Construction Association published a "best practices" guide for proper use and operation of roof seaming tools.

=== Maintenance ===
As with any tool, proper maintenance will increase the usefulness and life expectancy. Proper maintenance extends beyond the roof seamer, to the working surface on the roof. Before operating the roof seamer, ensure that the roof panel and seam are clean and clear of debris that could mark or gouge the forming dies. During operation check lubrication points and other recommended maintenance steps. In addition, most manufacturers will recommend scheduled service on an annual basis to ensure internal components are not worn or damaged.

=== Other tools ===
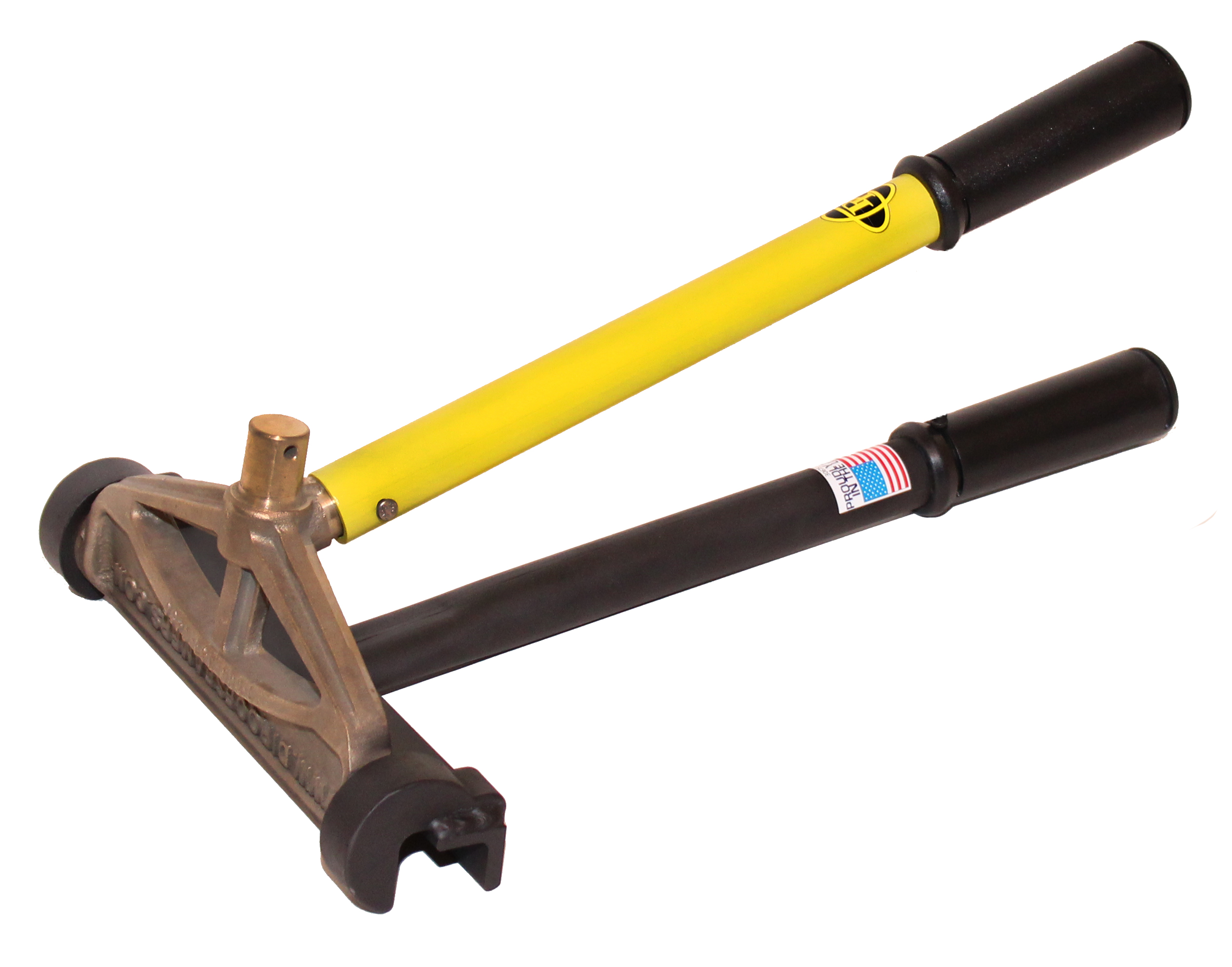
A hand crimper is used to flat-form the material ahead of a roof seamer or in place of roll forming in some applications.

In conjunction with the roof seaming machine, there are an array of hand tools that are used. The most common tool that is usually required when operating a roof seamer is a "hand crimper". The hand crimper is used to "flat form" the panel seams into the appropriate configuration to prepare the seam for the roof seamer to be applied. Other common tools are snips, nibblers, and shears.

== Support organizations ==
There are numerous professional and trade organizations that support metal roofing, metal construction and the core market where roof seamers are used. The Metal Roofing Alliance (MRA), Metal Construction Association (MCA), Metal Buildings Manufacturers Association (MBMA), the Metal Buildings Contractors and Erectors Association (MBCEA), and the National Roofing Contractors Association (NRCA) are just a few. In addition, many distributors and suppliers offer resources and support documentation for their particular product offerings.
