= Metal roof =

Roofing system featuring metal pieces or tiles

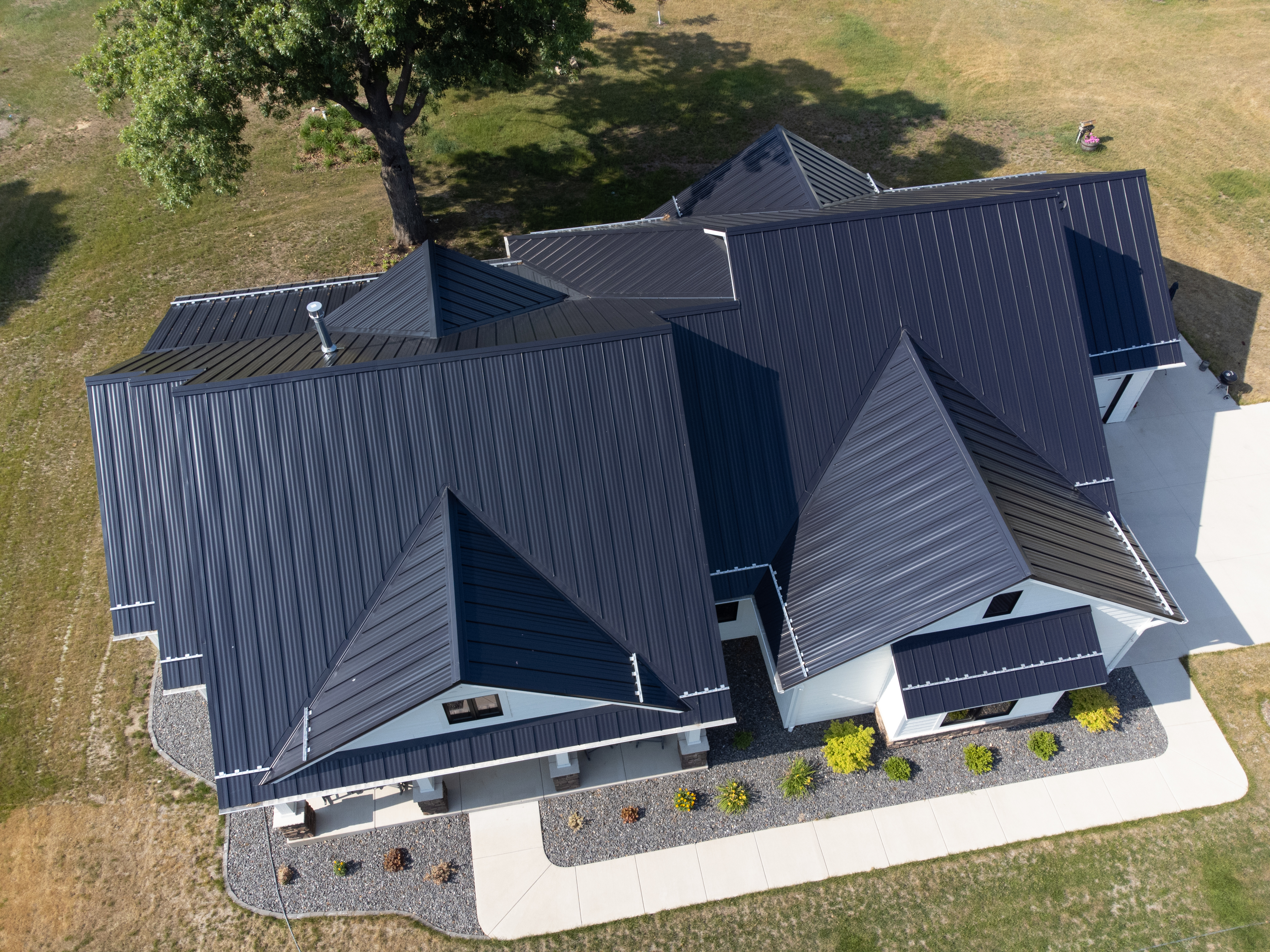
standing-seam metal roof

A metal roof is a roofing system featuring metal pieces or tiles exhibiting corrosion resistance, impermeability to water, and long life. It is a component of the building envelope. The metal pieces may be a covering on a structural, non-waterproof roof, or they could be self-supporting sheets.

== History ==
Lead and copper have played a significant role in architecture for thousands of years (see: copper in architecture). Lead was one of the first and easiest metals to smelt and with a low melting point, it could be easily formed to be watertight. As a by-product of silver smelting, in Roman times it was readily available and relatively cheap.

In the 3rd century BCE, copper roof shingles were installed atop the Lovamahapaya Temple in Sri Lanka. The Romans used copper as roof covering for the Pantheon in 27 BCE. Centuries later, copper and its alloys were integral in European medieval architecture. The copper roof of St. Mary's Cathedral, Hildesheim, installed in 1280 CE, survived until its destruction during bombings in World War II. The roof at Kronborg, one of Northern Europe's most important Renaissance castles (immortalized as Elsinore Castle in Shakespeare’s Hamlet) was installed in 1585 CE. The copper on the tower was renovated in 2009.

When iron smelting became widespread in the early 19th century, although the smelting process was complicated, ore was so plentiful that iron became cheaper than lead, and much cheaper than copper. It was later determined that iron corrosion (rust) could be stopped or at least slowed by dipping the hot iron sheets into molten tin or zinc, forming a metallurgically bonded coating which protected it. Terne, an iron plate dipped into a solder of 80–90% lead with only the remainder tin, was cheaper than tinplate made in the same way, and the lead was more resistant in long-term outside use than tin or zinc alone. Terne became popular for roofs and weather-resistant farm items.

In 1829, Henry Palmer, engineer of the London Dock Company, patented "indented or corrugated metallic sheets" which added additional stiffness to bending in one direction in the manner of a beam. This allowed the sheet iron to be self-supporting when used as a roof; a contemporary account praised the material as "the lightest and strongest roof (for its weight) since the days of Adam".

After Palmer's patent expired in 1843, corrugated galvanized iron (CGI) became a world-wide favorite roofing material. In the later 19th century, steel mills replaced iron works, and the product using steel could be made thinner for the same span and stiffness performance, but the term CGI remains in the UK and Australia. In the early 20th century, after being used for military purposes in the trenches and for Nissen or Quonset huts, CGI roofs were widely used but had low status. After architects such as Walter Gropius and Buckminster Fuller used the material, and with shiny and streamlined "desert modernist" designs such as Pierre Koenig's Stahl House (with an interior exposed metal roof, but not actual CGI), it recovered status. Albert Frey's 1964 Palm Springs house used actual corrugated steel as roofing, as well as corrugated aluminum exterior siding.

== Environmentally friendly ==
Metal roofs are 100% recyclable and can be made from other recycled products. Asphalt shingles are petroleum based, with other chemicals making their recycling process more toxic, and most shingles are not recycled; 20 billion pounds (9.1 million tonnes) are sent to landfills annually, where they take hundreds of years to decompose. Metal roofs' emissivity is better at reflecting solar radiation at 10%–75% depending on the color choice compared to asphalt roofs that reflect 5%–25% depending on their color. Over the lifetimes of metal roofs, they keep 95% of their reflective capacity, compared to other roof types that lose 20%–40% of their reflective capacity. The highly reflective coatings in the paint of metal roofing can lower utility bills by 40%.

== Advantages ==
Metal roofs can last up to 100 years, with installers providing 50-year warranties. Because of their longevity, most metal roofs are less expensive than asphalt shingles in the long term.

Metal roofing can consist of a high percentage of recycled material and is 100% recyclable. It does not get as hot as asphalt, a common roofing material, and it reflects heat away from the building underneath in summertime. On a larger scale, its use reduces the heat island effect of cities when compared to asphalt. Coupled with its better insulating abilities, metal roofs can offer not only a 40% reduction in energy costs in the summer, but also up to a 15% reduction in the energy costs in the winter according to a 2008 study by Oak Ridge National Laboratory. This finding is based on the use of a strapping system of 4 inches (100 mm) between the plywood and "cool-color" metal on top, which provides an air gap between the plywood roof sheathing and the metal. Cool-color metals are light, reflective colors, like white. The study went on to say that resealing and insulating air ducts in the attic will save even more money.

Metal roofing is also lightweight, creates little stress on the load-bearing roof support structures and can be installed on top of an existing roof. A lightweight roof is very useful for large or old structures, as it helps to maintain the overall structural integrity of the building. Despite its light weight, metal roofing provides increased wind resistance when compared to other roofing materials. This is because metal roofing systems use interlocking panels. Metal roofing sheets are also resistant to any kind of attack by pests and insects.

== Material types ==
Metal roofs are sometimes made of corrugated galvanized steel: a wrought iron–steel sheet was coated with zinc and then roll-formed into corrugated sheets. Another approach is to blend zinc, aluminum, and silicon-coated steel. These products are sold under various trade names like "Zincalume" or "Galvalume". The surface may display the raw zinc finish, or it may be used as a base metal under factory-coated colors.

== Standing-seam metal roof ==
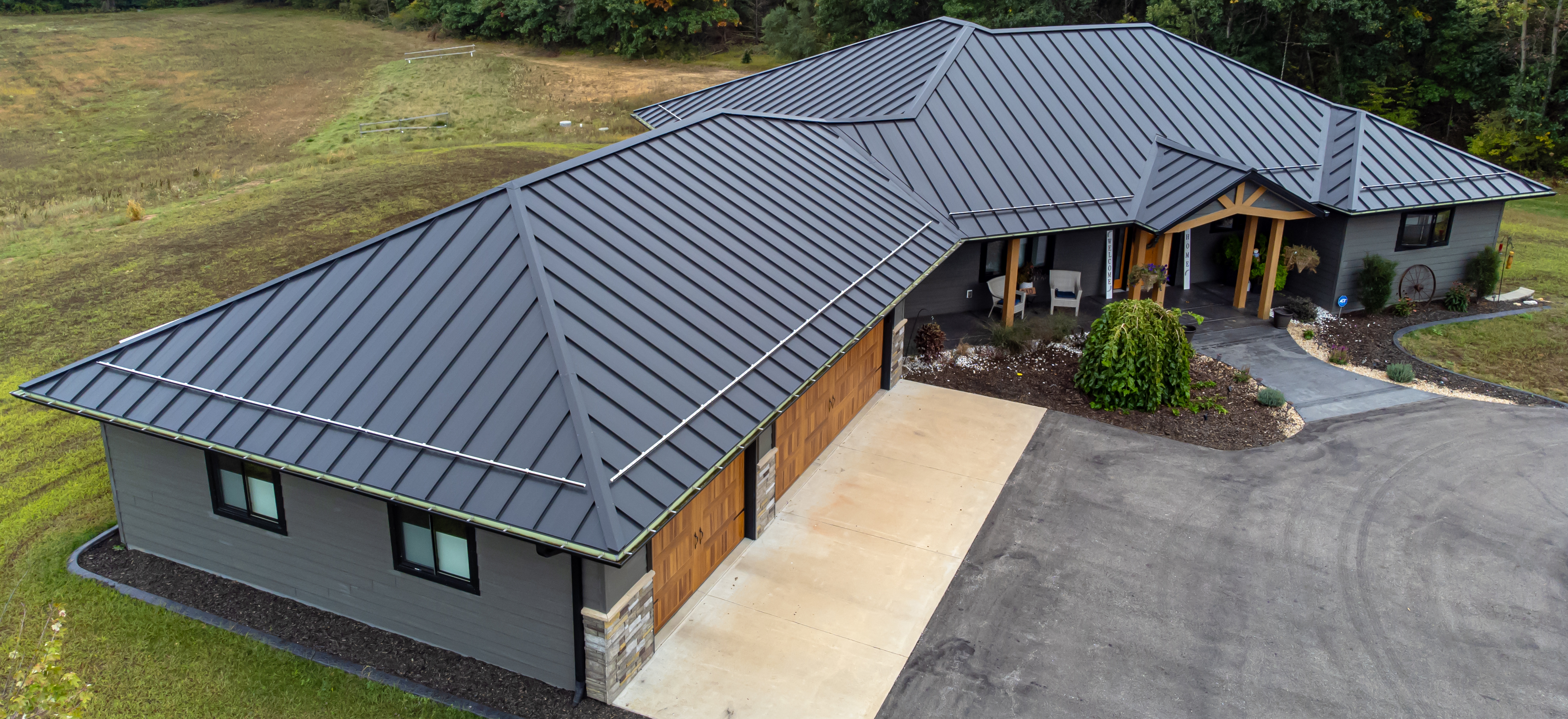
Standing-seam metal roof with snow guards.

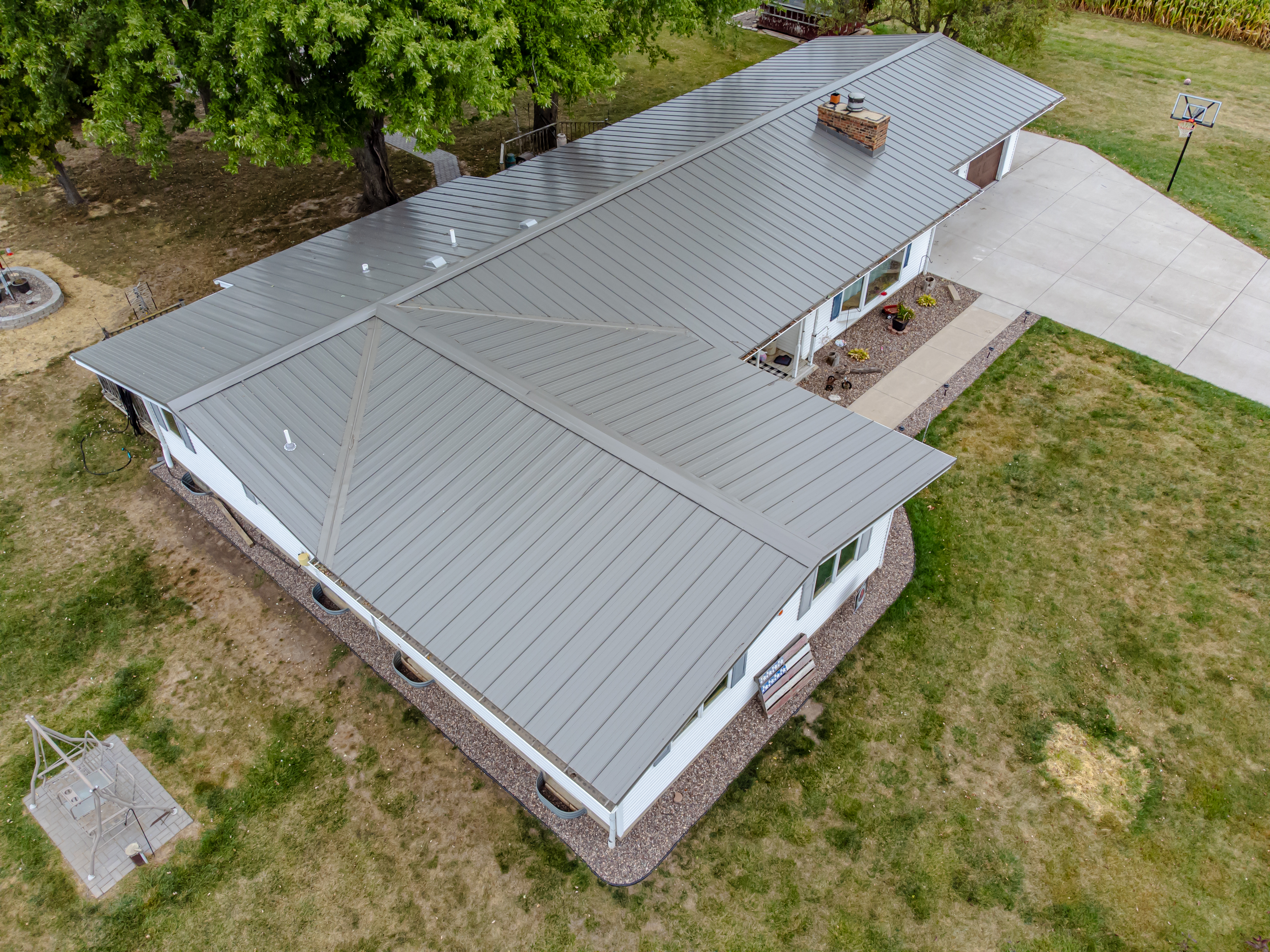
Standing-seam metal roofs can have a lower pitch than asphalt shingle roofs because shingled roofs need a higher pitch to keep the wind from blowing up the shingles and potentially blowing them off in high winds

Standing-seam metal roofs come in sheets up to or sometimes more than 30 feet (9.1 m) long and widths of 12, 14, 16 or 18 inches (300, 360, 410 or 460 mm). The standing seam is typically 1 1/2 or 1 3/4 inches (38 or 44 mm). They are more expensive upfront for installation and material costs but last longer than asphalt shingles. Over a lifespan of at least 50 years, they are less expensive than asphalt shingle roofs. They require less maintenance than corrugated metal roofs because of the exposed fasteners on that roof.

=== Mechanically seamed ===
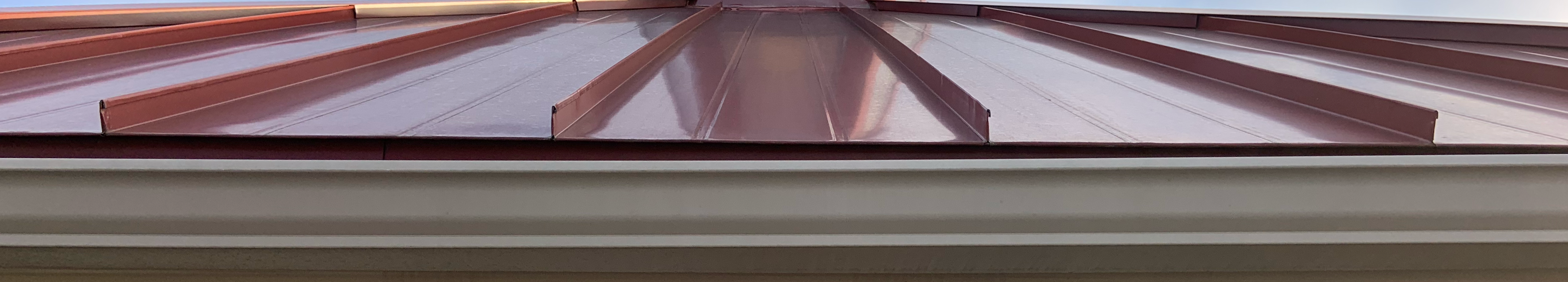
Mechanically seamed standing seams.

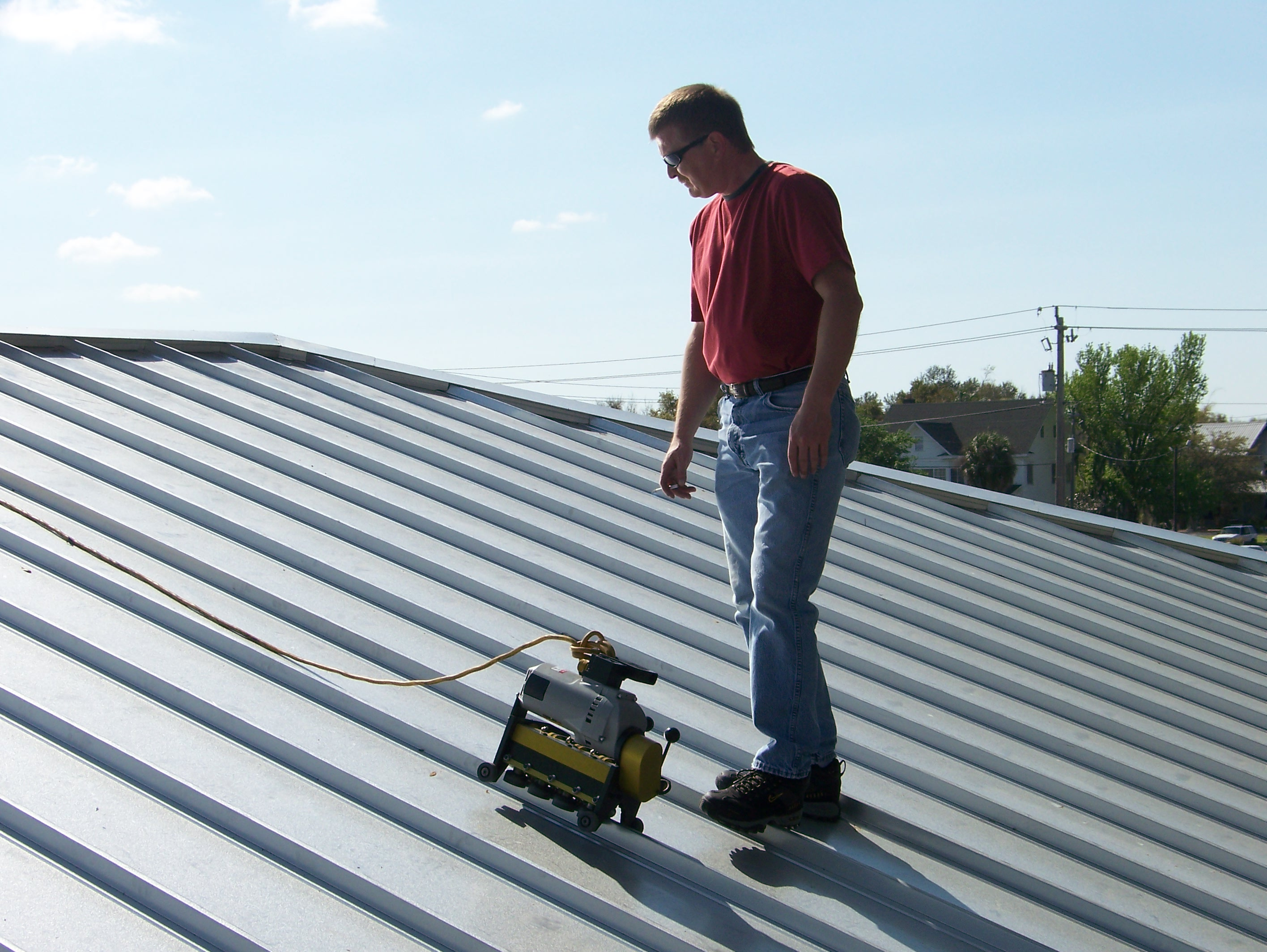
Worker and roof seamer machine.

Mechanically seamed roofs are seamed together using a roof seamer and can be either single lock or double lock seamed, meaning they can be folded under once to be seamed together or folded under twice for extra weather protection. This is the most expensive of the three types but is the most weather resistant.

=== Snap-locked with fastener strip ===
One side of the standing-seam sheet is snap-locked into the other standing-seam sheet that is fastened to the roof, concealing those fasteners, and the other side of the sheet is fastened to the roof with screws, and the next sheet will cover those screws as well. The fastener screws should not be screwed in too tightly to allow the sheet to expand and contract with the changing temperatures. Each fastener slot has some room to move past the screw to adjust for thermal expansion. The fastener heads breaking off potentially is the down side to this method if installed improperly or from wear and tear from the fluctuating climate.

=== Snap-locked with clips ===
Snap-locked with metal clips fastened to the roof allows for more thermal expansion than fastener-strip standing-seam metal roofs. The fasteners and clips are both hidden under the metal roof sheets, and this option is marginally more expensive than the fastener-strip snap-locked standing-seam roof.

== Thin-film solar on metal roofs ==
Thin-film solar running down standing-seam metal roof
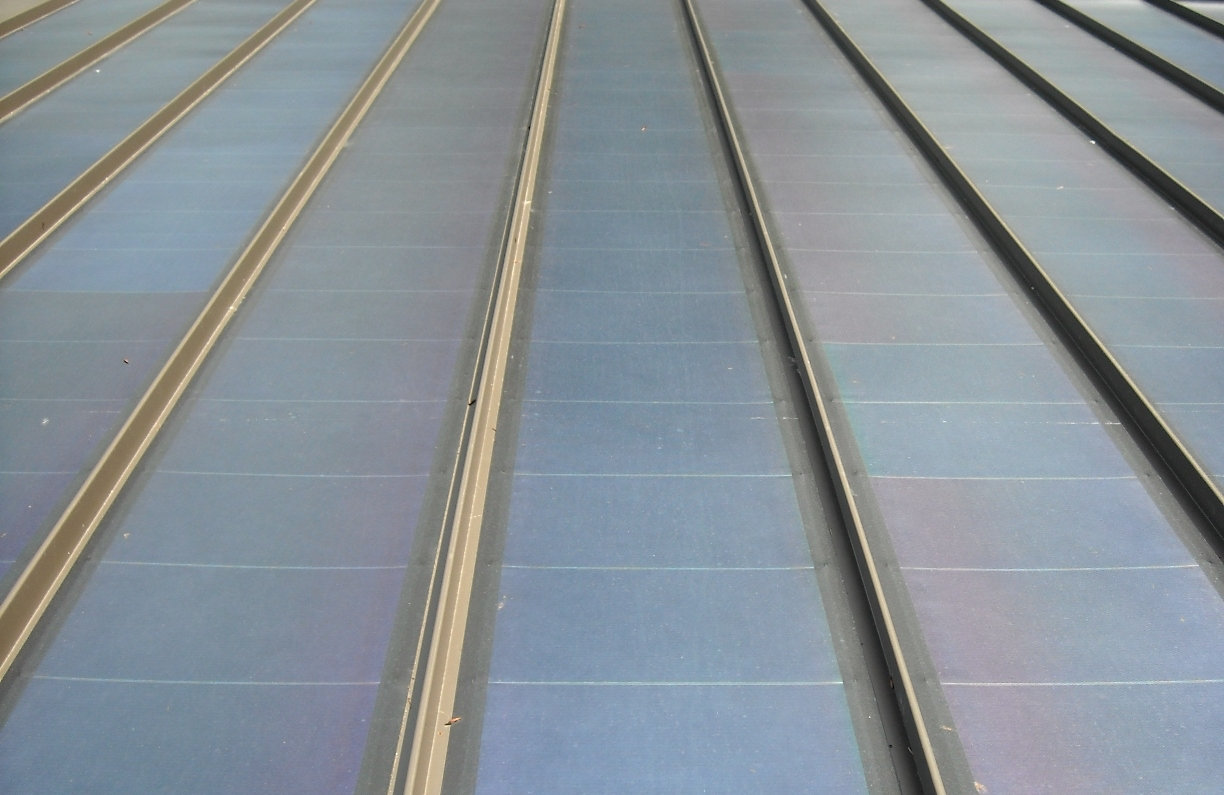
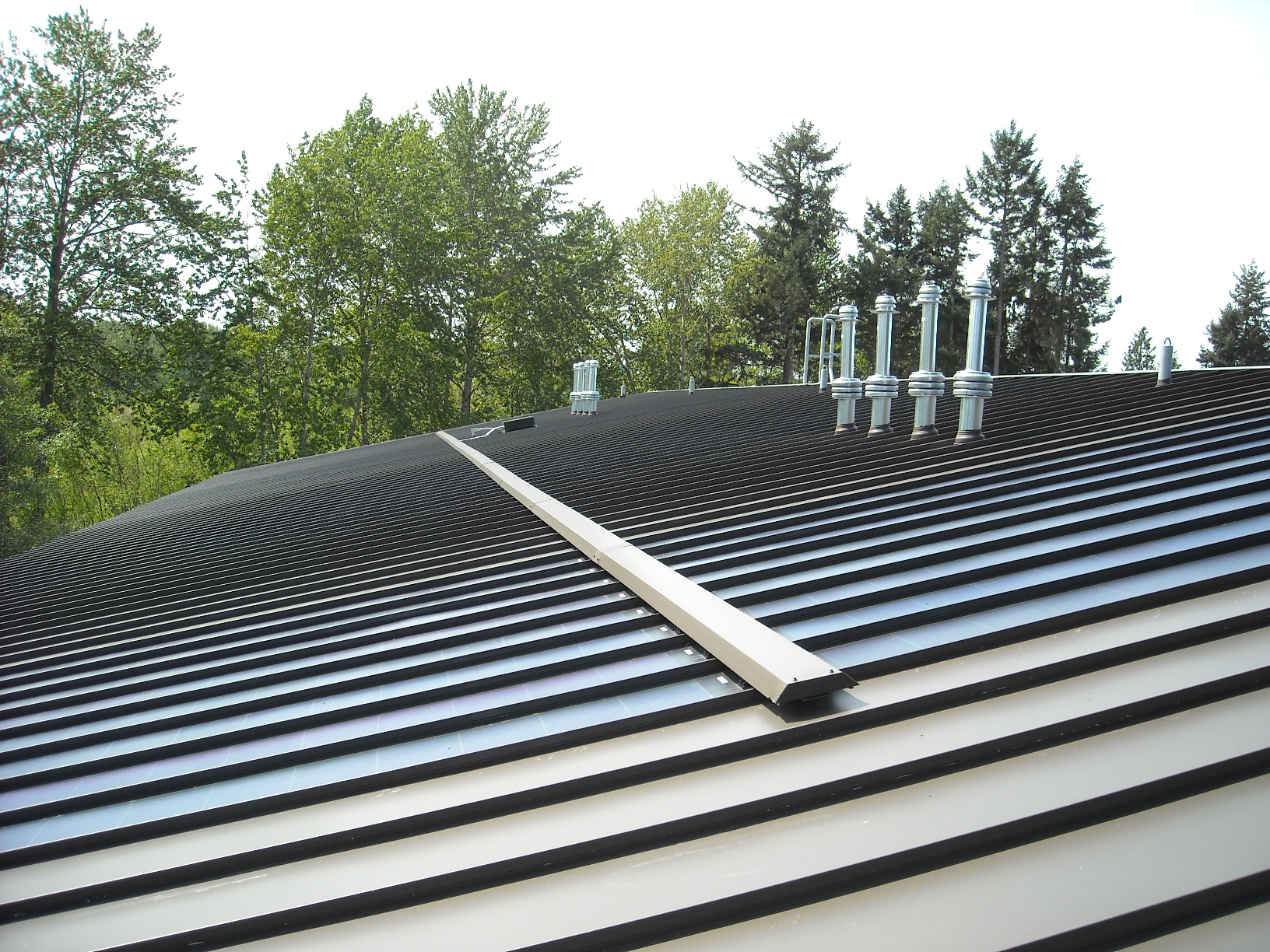

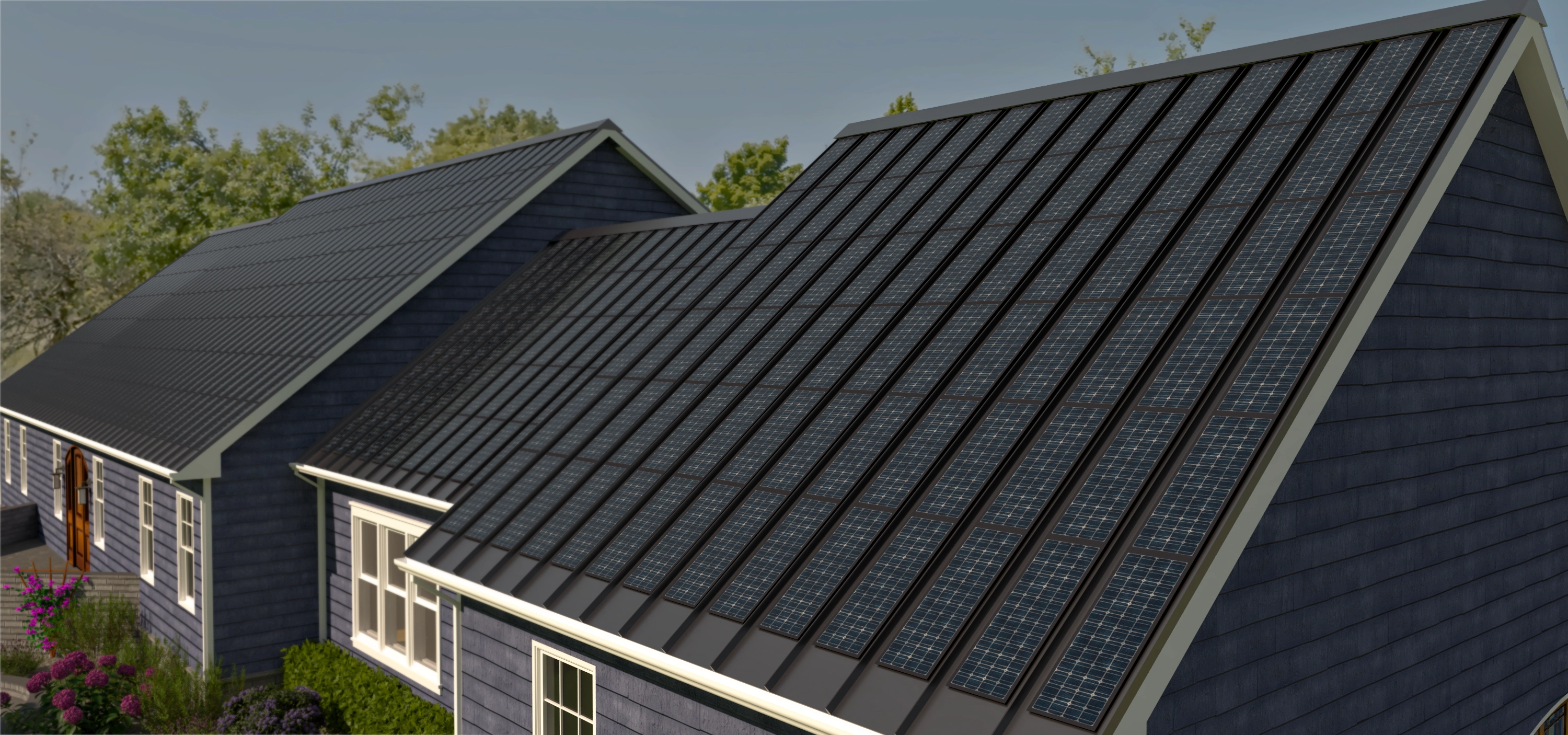
3D sketch of thin-film solar on standing-seam metal roof

With the increasing efficiencies of thin-film solar cells, installing them on metal roofs has become cost competitive with traditional monocrystalline and polycrystalline solar cells. The thin-film panels are flexible and run down the standing-seam metal roofs and stick to the metal roof with adhesive, so no holes are needed to install. The connection wires run under the ridge cap at the top of the roof. Efficiency ranges from 10–18% but costs only about $2.00–$3.00 per watt of installed capacity, compared to monocrystalline which is 17–22% efficient and costs $3.00–$3.50 per watt of installed capacity. Thin-film solar is light weight at 2.1–3.1 kg/m^{2} (7–10 oz/ft^{2}). Thin-film solar panels last 10–20 years but have a quicker ROI than traditional solar panels. The metal roofs last 40–70 years before replacement compared to 12–20 years for an asphalt shingle roof.

Cost of different solar roof types
Type	Cost per watt	Efficiency	Average 6 kW system cost
Polycrystalline	$2.80–$3.00	13–17%	$17,400
Monocrystalline	$3.00–$3.50	17–22%	$19,000
Thin-film panels	$2.00–$3.00	10–18%	$17,000

== Corrugated metal roof ==
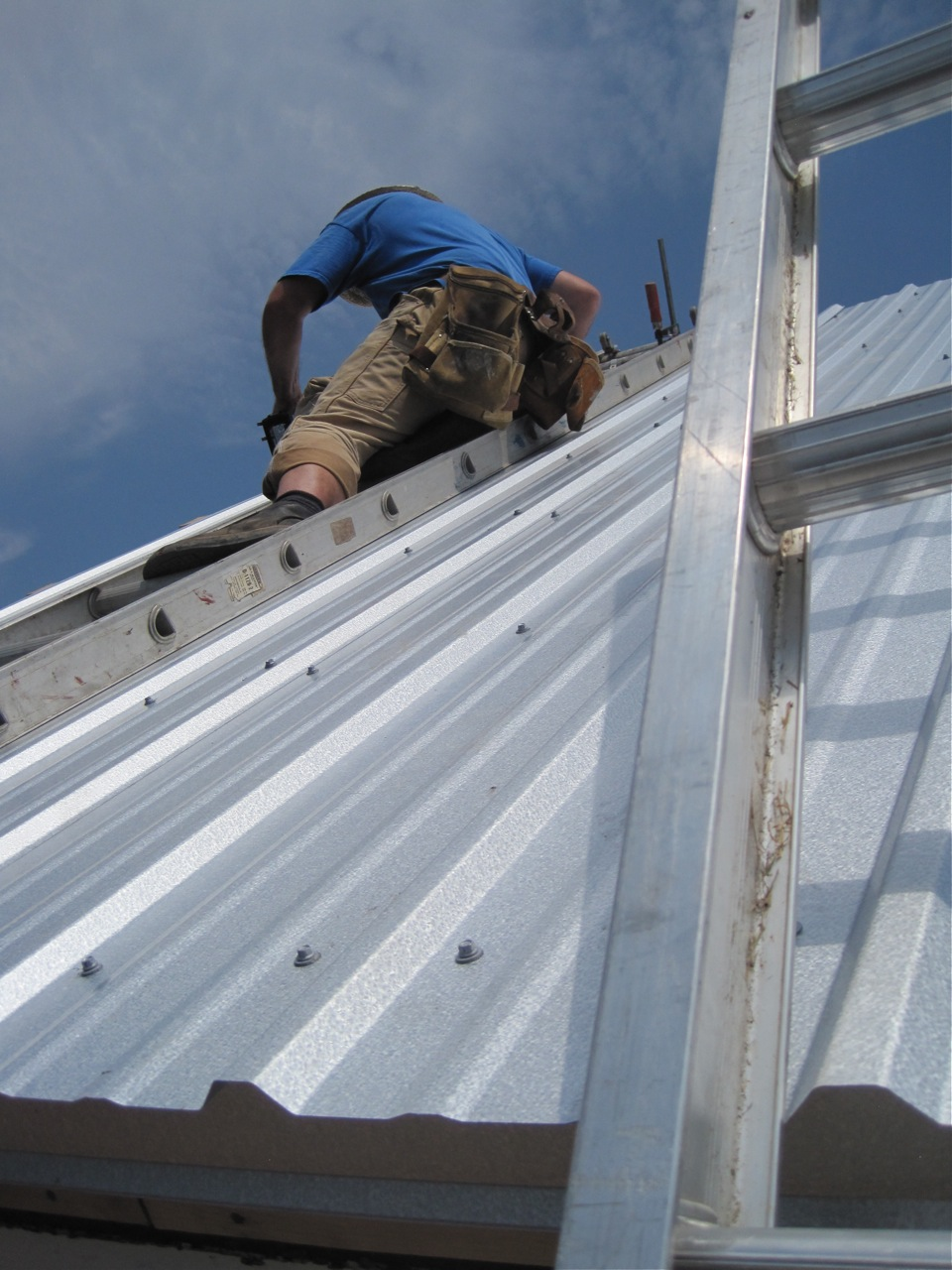
Corrugated metal roof with fasteners exposed.

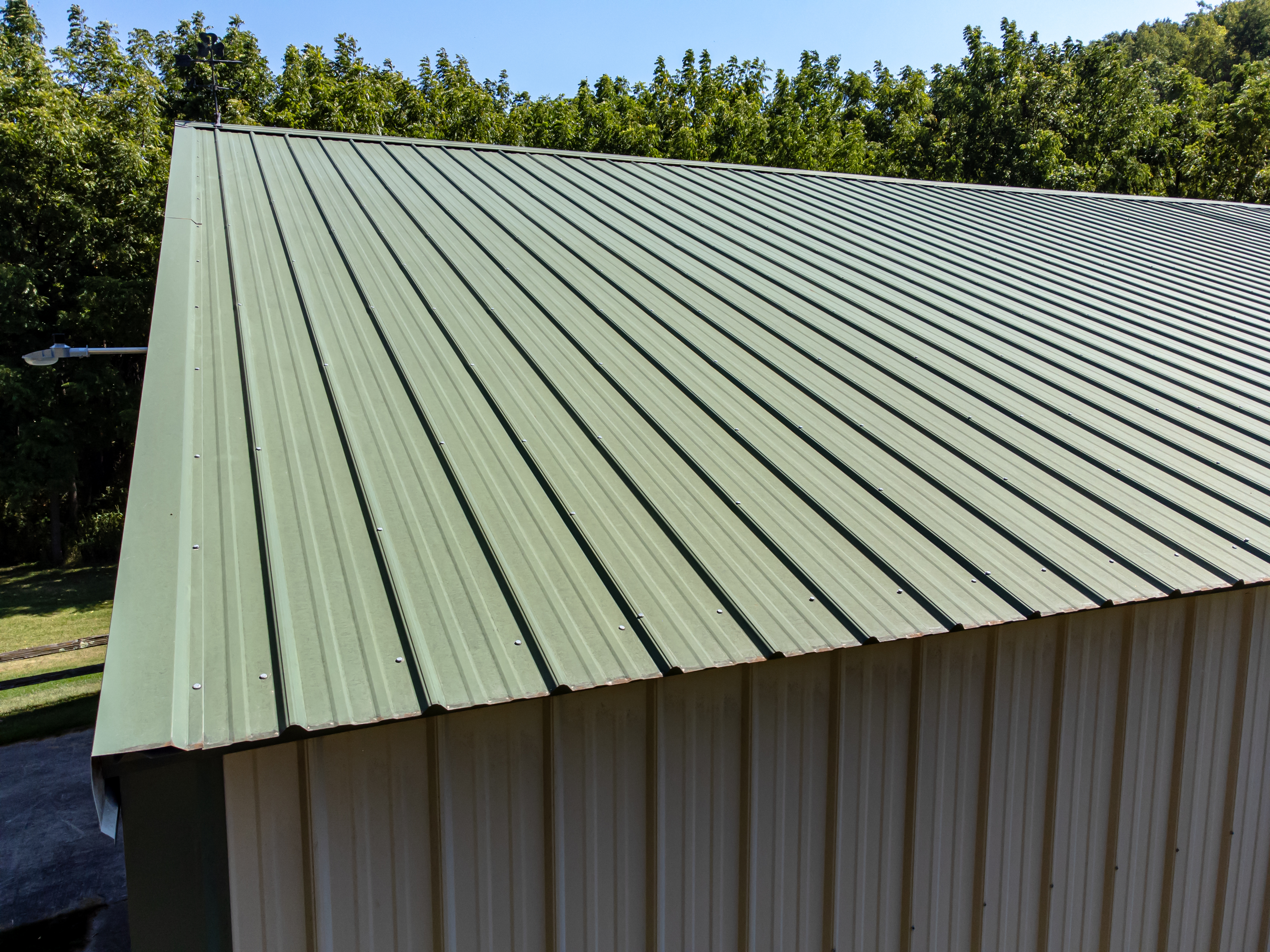
Corrugated metal roof with fasteners screwed through the roof.

Corrugated metal roofs are prefabricated sheets that are bent and wavy to make them more rigid.

Corrugated metal roofs are similar in price to asphalt shingle roof installation. The fasteners are screwed through the metal into the roof requiring more maintenance to make sure the screws stay secured. Corrugated metal roofs can last 30–45 years with proper maintenance.

== Stone-coated metal roofing ==
Metal tile sheets can also be employed. These are usually painted or stone-coated steel. Stone coated steel roofing panels are made from zinc/aluminium-coated steel with an acrylic gel coating. The stones are usually a natural product with a colored ceramic coating. Stainless steel is another option. It is usually roll-formed into standing-seam profiles for roofing; however, individual shingles are also available. Other metals used for roofing are lead, tin, aluminium and copper.

== Copper roofs ==
Copper is used for roofing because it offers corrosion resistance, durability, long life, low maintenance, radio frequency shielding, lightning protection, and sustainability benefits. Copper roofs are often one of the most architecturally distinguishable features of prominent buildings, including churches, government buildings, and universities. Today, copper is used in not only in roofing systems, but also for flashings and copings, rain gutters and downspouts, domes, spires, vaults, and various other architectural design elements. At the Lyle Center for Regenerative Studies in Pomona, California, copper was chosen for the roofing on regenerative principles: if the building were to be dismantled the copper could be reused because of its high value in recycling and its variety of potential uses. A vented copper roof assembly at Oak Ridge National Laboratories (U.S.) substantially reduced heat gain compared with stone-coated steel shingle (SR246E90) or asphalt shingle (SR093E89), resulting in lower energy costs.

=== Coating ===
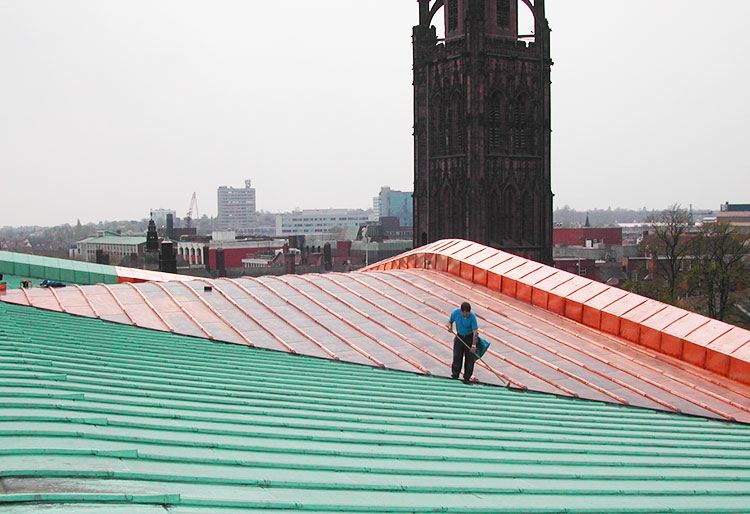
Coating copper roof

Several types of coatings are used on metal panels to prevent rust, provide waterproofing, or reflect heat. They are made of various materials such as epoxy and ceramic.

Ceramic coatings can be applied on metal roof materials to add heat-reflective properties. Most ceramic coatings are made from regular paint with ceramic beads mixed in as an additive.

Coatings are sometimes applied to copper. Clear coatings preserve the natural color, warmth, and metallic tone of copper alloys. Oils exclude moisture from copper roofs and flashings and simultaneously enhance their appearance by bringing out a rich luster and depth of color. The most popular oils are lemon oil (like USP), lemongrass oil (such as East Indian), paraffin oils, linseed oil, and castor oil. On copper roofing or flashing, reapplication once every three years can effectively retard patina formation. In arid climates, the maximum span between oilings may be extended up to five years. Opaque paint coatings are primarily applied over copper when substrate integrity and longevity are desired but a specific color other than the naturally occurring copper hues is required. Lead-sheet covered roofs are not considered metal roofs today, but since lead bonds metallurgically thin lead coatings on copper are very long-lasting. Lead-coated copper can be used when the appearance of exposed lead is desired or where copper-contaminated water runoff from bare copper alloys would ordinarily stain lighter-colored building materials, such as marble, limestone, stucco, mortar, or concrete. Zinc-tin coatings are an alternative to lead coatings since they have approximately the same appearance and workability.

== See also ==
- Corrugated galvanised iron
- Green building
- Metal Building Manufacturers Association
- Metal Construction Association
- Metal Roofing Alliance
- Passive house
- Reflective surfaces (geoengineering)
- Roof seamer
- Rubber shingle roof
