= Avalanche control =

Activities to reduce avalanche hazards

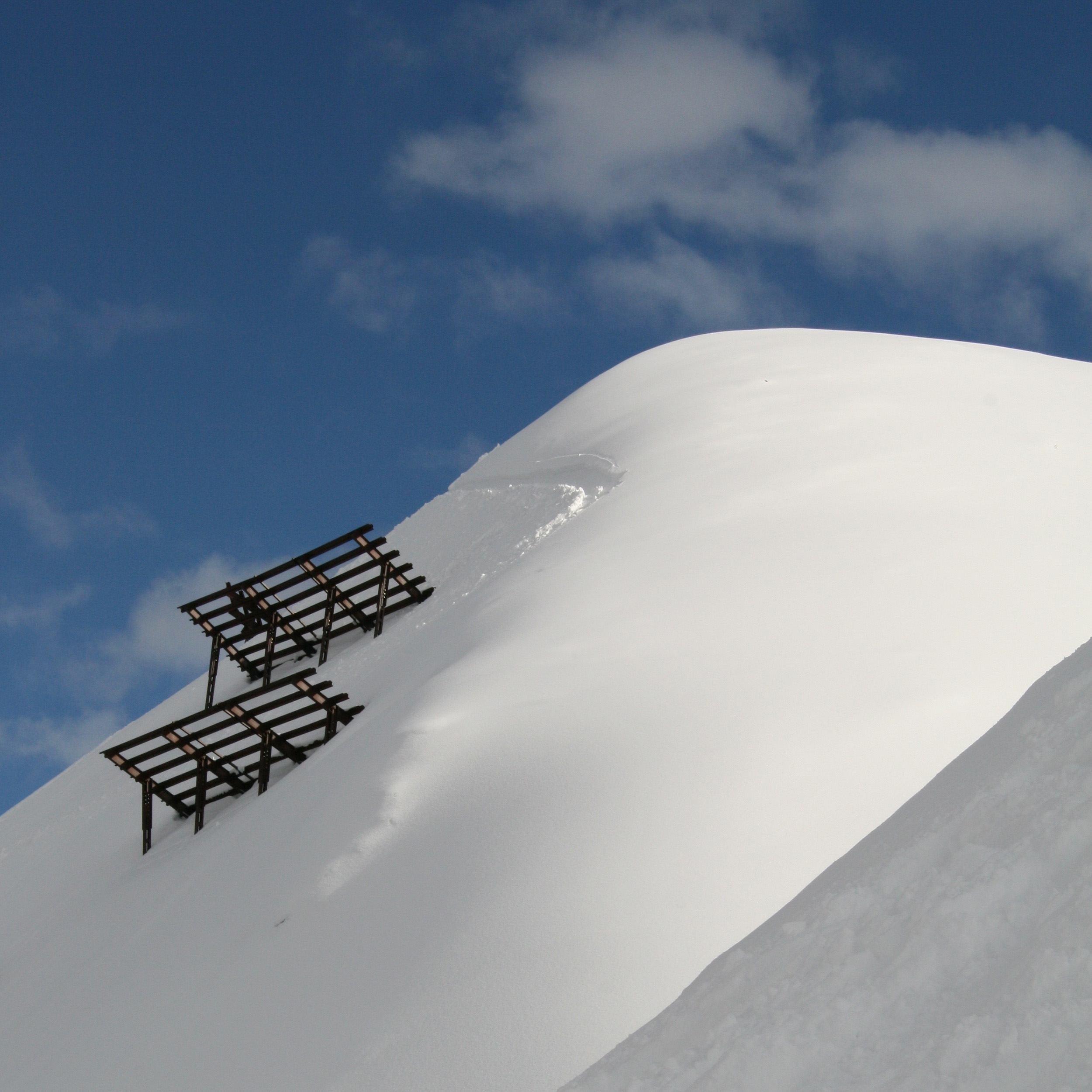
An avalanche snow bridge near a ski-resort in Vorarlberg

Avalanche control or avalanche defense activities reduce the hazard avalanches pose to human life, activity, and property. Avalanche control begins with a risk assessment conducted by surveying for potential avalanche terrain by identifying geographic features such as vegetation patterns, drainages, and seasonal snow distribution that are indicative of avalanches. From the identified avalanche risks, the hazard is assessed by identifying threatened human geographic features such as roads, ski-hills, and buildings. Avalanche control programs address the avalanche hazard by formulating prevention and mitigation plans, which are then executed during the winter season. The prevention and mitigation plans combine extensive snow pack observation with three major groups of interventions: active, passive and social - sometimes more narrowly defined as "explosive", "structural", and "awareness" according to the most prevalent technique used in each. Avalanche control techniques either directly intervene in the evolution of the snow pack, or lessen the effect of an avalanche once it has occurred. For the event of human involvement, avalanche control organizations develop and train exhaustive response and recovery plans.

== Prevention and mitigation ==
Prevention and mitigation begins with observing the snow pack to forecast the risk of avalanche occurrence. The forecast risk then determines the necessary interventions to reduce the hazard posed by an avalanche.

=== Observation and forecasting ===
Snow pack observation studies the layering and distribution of the snow to estimate the instabilities of the snow pack and thus the risk of an avalanche occurring in a particular terrain feature. In areas of heavy human use the snow pack is monitored throughout the winter season to assess its evolution under the prevailing meteorological conditions. In contrast to heavily used avalanche terrain where forecasting is the goal of snow observation, in remote terrain, or terrain that is infrequently visited, snow pack observation elucidates the immediate instabilities of the snow pack.

=== Active interventions ===
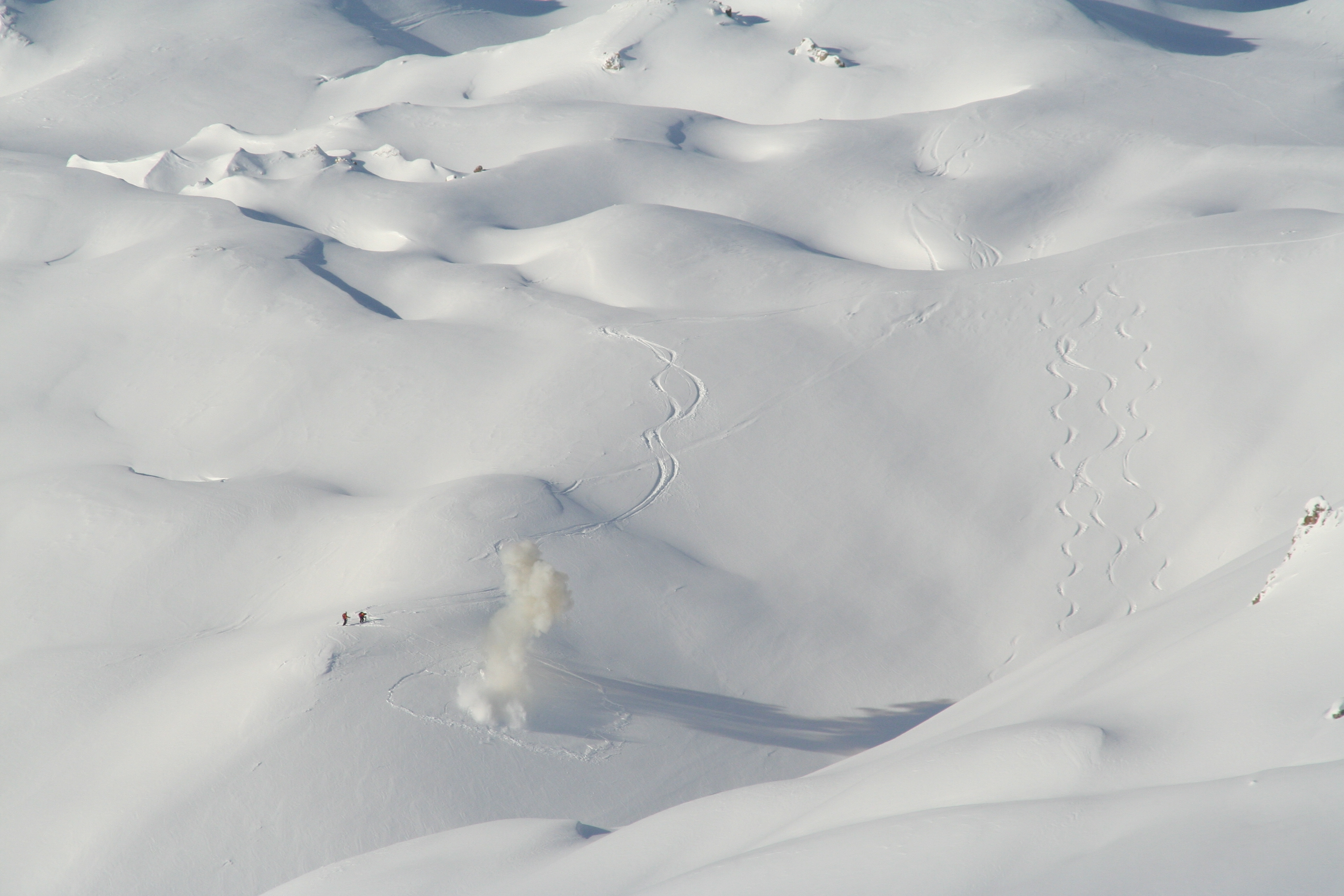
Avalanche blasting in the French ski resort of Tignes (3,600 m or 11,800 ft)

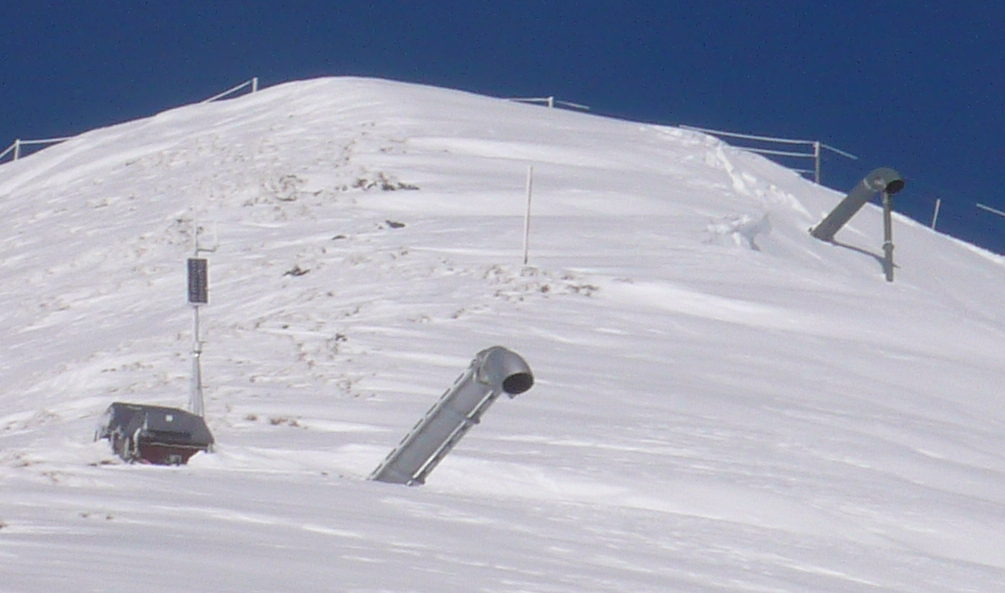
Gazex installation

Active techniques reduce the risk of an avalanche occurring by promoting the stabilization and settlement of the snow pack through three forms of intervention: disrupting weak layers in the snow pack, increasing the uniformity of the snow pack, and lessening the amount of snow available in snow pack for entrainment in an avalanche; this can be accomplished either by triggering smaller less hazardous avalanches, or by directly influencing the structure of the layering of the snow pack. Active avalanche control can be broadly classified into either mechanical or explosive methods. Mechanical methods are typically used in either remote terrain, smaller terrain, or less hazardous terrain; while explosive methods are used in accessible large high hazard terrain, or terrain with industrial, commercial recreational, urbanized, and transportation usage.

In the smallest terrain features the simplest method of avalanche control that disrupts weak snow layers by directly walking through them, a technique referred to as boot packing. For larger features this method can extended by mechanized redistribution of snow using large tracked vehicles called snow groomers. These two mechanical interventions can only be safely done as the snow is deposited and before it develops any instabilities. In terrain that can only be sporadically accessed, or in a highly developed snow pack that is too deep for boot packing, ski stabilization techniques are used. The first technique of ski stabilizing is a method of entering a slope called ski cutting. In this method a skier attempts to trigger a small avalanche by breaking the tensile support of the upper snow pack through a quick traverse along the top of the slope, the skier can be belayed on a rope to further protect them from being caught in an avalanche. A snow pack can then be further settled out, or stabilized, by further down slope ski traffic through it. Finally knotted cord can be used to saw through the roots of cornices, causing the cornice to drop onto the snow pack of the slope below. This has the combined effect of reducing the objective hazard posed by the cornice, and providing a large impact force on the snow pack.

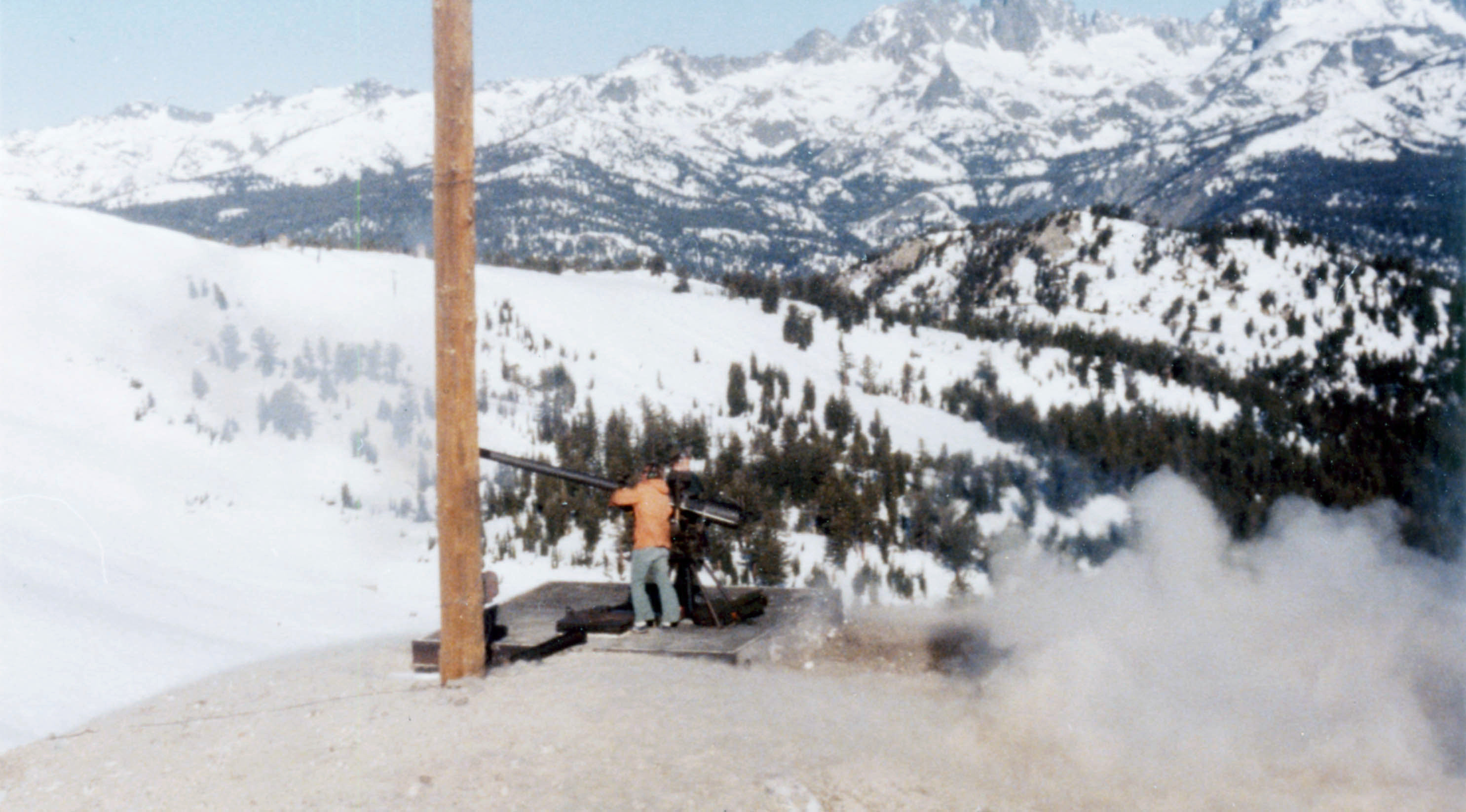
U.S. Forest Service team using a 105mm recoilless rifle for avalanche control at Mammoth Mountain in the Inyo National Forest.

Explosive techniques involve the artificial triggering of smaller less destructive avalanches, by detonating charges either above or on the snow surface. The explosives may be deployed by manually hand tossing and lowering, by bombing from a helicopter, or by shelling with a howitzer, recoilless rifle, or air gun. In balancing the hazard to personnel with the effectiveness of the deployment method at accessing and triggering avalanche terrain, each method has its drawbacks and advantages. Among the newest methods, strategically placed remote controlled installations that generate an air blast by detonating a fuel-air explosive above the snow pack in an avalanche starting zone, offer fast and effective response to avalanche control decisions while minimizing the risk to avalanche control personnel; a feature especially important for avalanche control in transportation corridors. For example, the Avalanche Towers (Sprengmast) Austria, and Norway use solar powered launchers to deploy charges from a magazine containing 12 radio controlled charges. The magazines can be transported, loaded, and removed from the towers by helicopter, without the need for a flight assistant, or on site personnel.

Explosive control has proved to be effective in areas with easy access to avalanche starting areas and where minor avalanches can be tolerated. It is mostly unacceptable, however, in areas with human residence and where there is even a small probability of a larger avalanche.

=== Permanent interventions ===
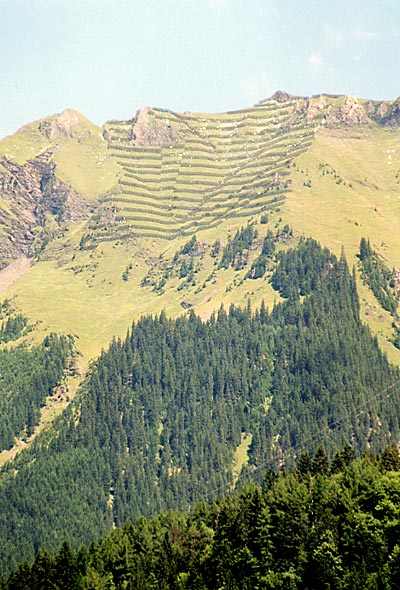
Forest and structures to protect against avalanches.

Permanent techniques slow, stop, divert, or prevent snow from moving; either completely or to enough of an extent that the destructive forces are significantly lessened. Permanent techniques involve constructing structures and modifying terrain for purposes classified as:

- Snow retention structures (snow racks, avalanche snow bridges, snow nets), used in the upper path of probable avalanche paths
- Avalanche barriers: The main part of the avalanche barriers is based on a high tensile strength steel wire mesh, extending across the slope and reaching to the surface of the snow. The supporting effect created by the retaining surface prevents possible creeping within the snow cover and sliding of the snow cover on the terrain surface. Breaking-away of avalanches is thus prevented at the starting zone, while occurring snow movements are restricted to the extent that they remain harmless. The forces resulting from the snow pressure are absorbed by the snow nets and carried off over the swivel posts and anchor ropes into the anchor points.
- Snow guard devices (used to increase snow retention on roofs).
- Snow redistribution structures (wind baffles, snow fences)
- Snow deflection structures used to deflect and confine the moving snow within the avalanche track. They should not deflect the avalanche sharply, because in the latter case they may be easily overrun by snow.
- Snow retardation structures (e.g. snow breakers), mostly used in small-slope parts of the avalanche track, to enhance the natural retardation
- Snow catchment structures
- Direct protection of important objects and structures, e.g., by snow sheds (avalanche sheds) or schneekragens (in mining areas).

A single intervention may fulfill the needs of multiple classes of purpose, for example, avalanche dams, ditches, earth mounds, and terraces are used for deflection, retardation, and catchment. Other passive methods include:

- reforestation, up the natural tree line — forests serve all the functions of artificial avalanche defenses: retention, redistribution, retardation and catchment.
- snow caves, as well as recessed, dug out, and snow walled quinzhees and bivouac shelters are used to temporarily protect bivouacking climbers and skiers by providing them with breathing space in the event of burial by avalanches.
- Architectural streamlining and wedge shaping buildings, such as those found in the historic high mountain villages of the Alps.

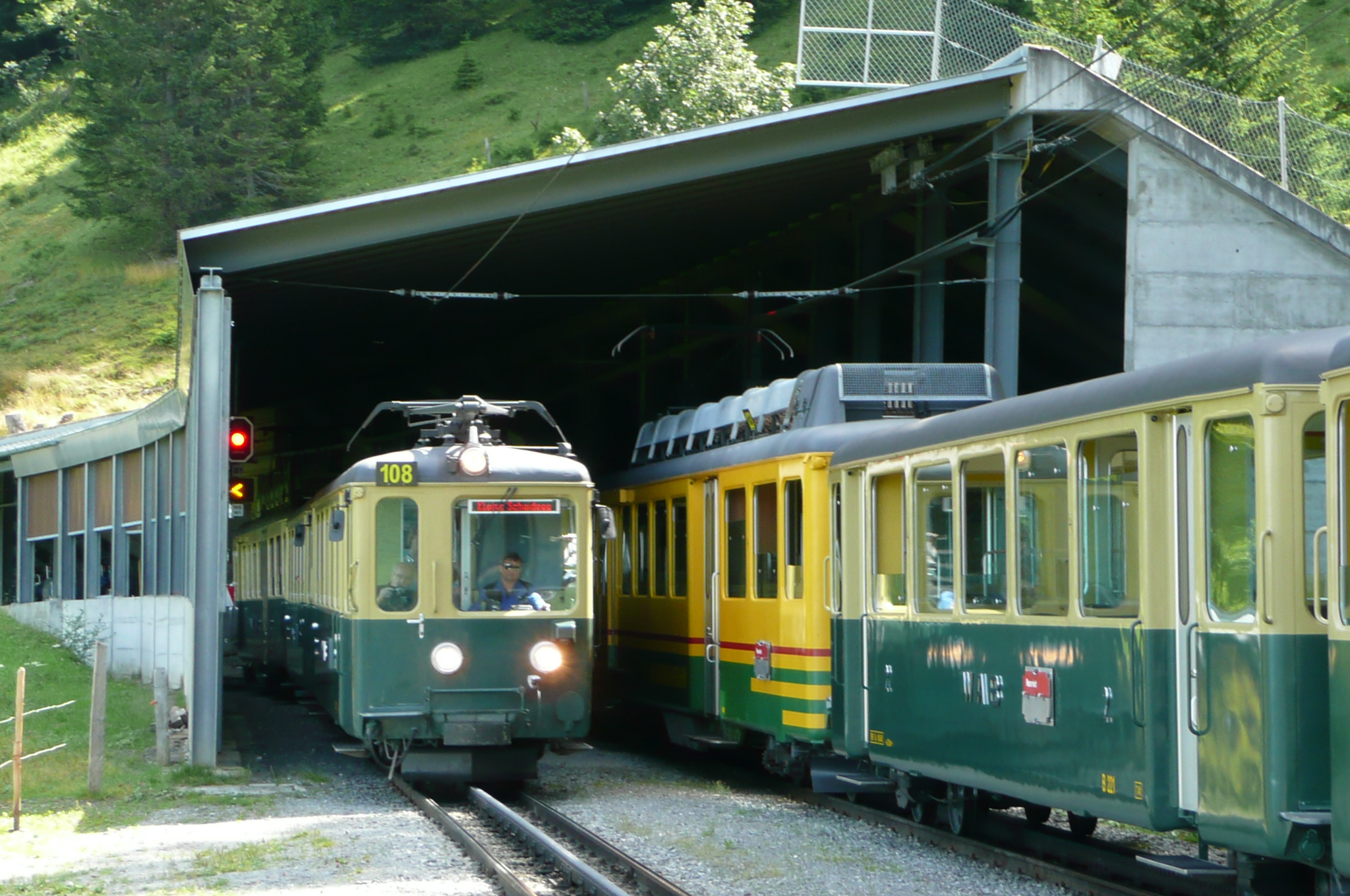
Trains passing in an avalanche gallery on the Wengernalpbahn in Switzerland.

==== Snow shed ====
A snow shed or avalanche gallery is a type of rigid snow-supporting structure for avalanche control or to maintain passage in areas where snow removal becomes almost impossible. They can be made of steel, prestressed concrete frames, or timber. These structures can be fully enclosed, like an artificial tunnel, or consist of lattice-like elements. They are typically of robust construction considering the environments they must survive in.

Snow protection is particularly important when routes cross avalanche "chutes", which are natural ravines or other formations that direct or concentrate avalanches.

Snow sheds or avalanche galleries are a common sight on railroads in mountain areas, such as Marias Pass and Donner Pass in the United States, or many of the Swiss mountain railways, where tracks are covered with miles of shedding. Although unused today, the Central Pacific Railroad had a complete rail yard under a roof on Donner Pass. They are also found on especially hazardous stretches of roadway as well. The Trans-Canada Highway between Revelstoke and Golden in British Columbia has several snow sheds covering both directions of travel to cope with the heavy snow.

East of Snoqualmie Pass in Washington in the northwest U.S., westbound Interstate 90 had a snow shed midway along the east shore of Keechelus Lake (47.355°N 121.3658°W, milepost 57.7); it was removed in 2014 in preparation for the construction of bridges to replace it. The 500-foot (150 m) concrete structure covered two lanes on a curve and was constructed in 1950 for U.S. Route 10, then one lane in each direction; it marked the first time precast construction was used for a highway structure in a mountainous area and was the last remaining snow shed on an Interstate highway.

==== Snow bridge ====
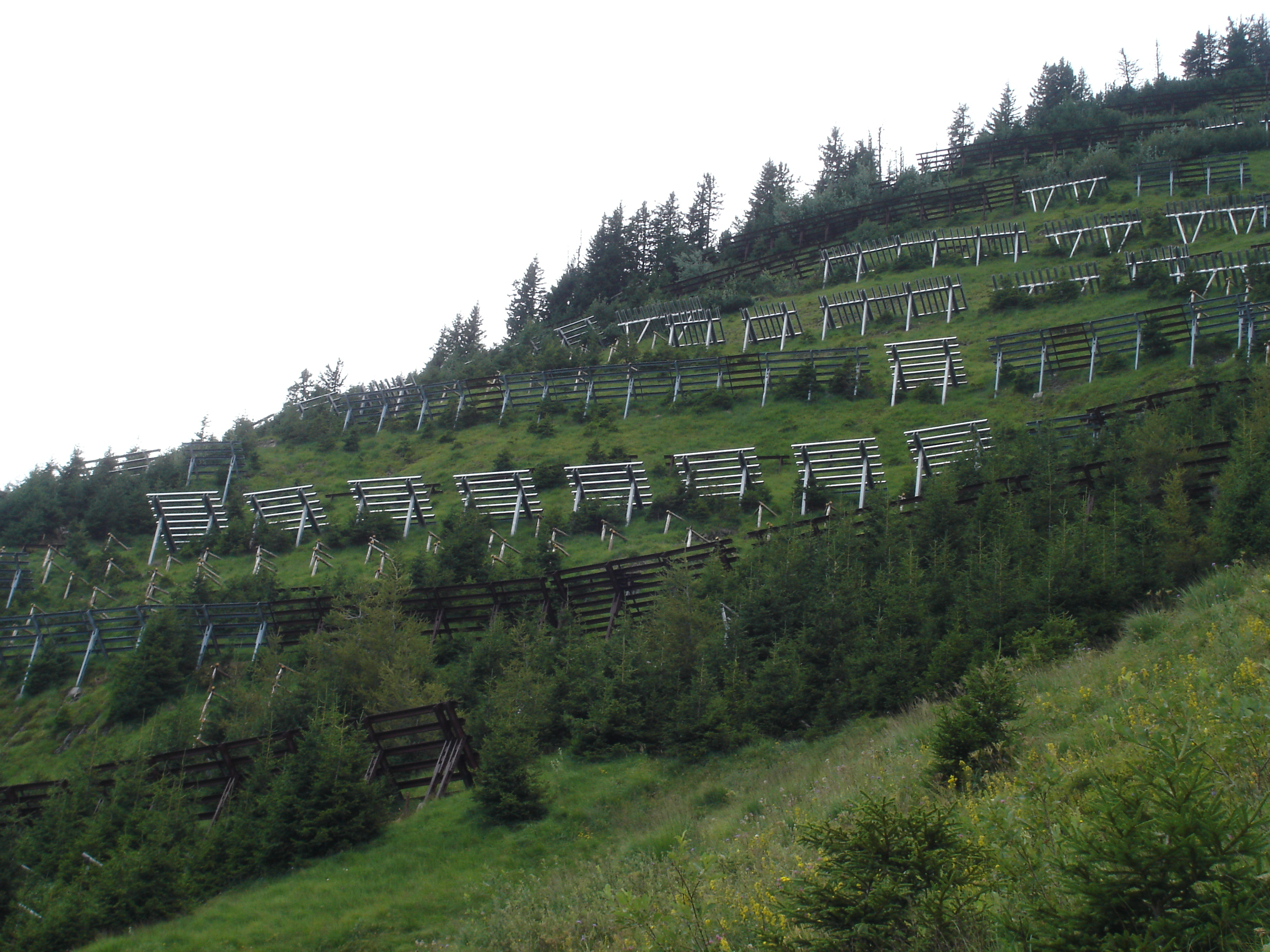
Snow bridges in Switzerland.

A snow bridge, avalanche barrier, or avalanche fence, looks superficially similar to snow fences, but they act differently. Snow fences are built vertically and accumulate snow on their downwind side, while snow bridges are slanted or horizontal and hold snow on their top side.

Snow bridges are fastened to the slope on the upslope side by tension anchors and on the downslope by compression anchors.

==== Avalanche dam ====
Avalanche dams (anti-avalanche dams, avalanche protection dams) are a type of avalanche control structure used for protection of inhabited areas, roads, power lines, etc., from avalanches. The two major types are deflection and catchment dams.

Both types of avalanche dams are usually placed in the run-out zone of the avalanche and in the flatter parts of the avalanche path. In other parts of the avalanche they are ineffective because they may be easily overrun or overfilled.

==== Avalanche net ====
Avalanche nets (snow avalanche protection nets, snow nets) are flexible snow supporting structures for avalanche control, constructed of steel or nylon cables or straps held by steel poles, optionally supplied with compression anchors downhill. They are installed in the upper parts of potential avalanche paths to prevent snow from starting to slide into an avalanche, or to retard the slide.

Snow avalanche nets have the following advantages compared to rigid supporting structures (snow fences, snow racks, snow sheds):

- considerably lower costs
- better blending into the environment
- easier installation
- rigid structures are more prone to damage in unstable terrains (with earthquakes, landslides, rockfall, permafrost-mediated soil creep) and in conditions of heavy rainfall and mudflows.

Avalanche nets have some drawbacks, as they may be difficult to anchor in loose ground.

=== Social interventions ===
To mitigate the hazard of avalanches, social interventions reduce the incidence and prevalence of human avalanche involvement by modifying the behavior of people, so that their use of avalanche terrain is adapted to prevent their involvement in avalanches. Avalanche control organizations accomplish this by targeting awareness and education programs at communities that frequent avalanche terrain. Surveys of avalanche accidents have observed that most avalanches that involve people are caused by people, and of those victims many were unaware of the risk of avalanche occurrence. To address this observation, introductory awareness and education programs provide instruction in the avoidance of hazardous avalanche involvement through the recognition of avalanche terrain, the observation of snow pack instabilities, and the identification of human activities that cause avalanches. Avalanche control organizations also publicly disseminate forecasts, bulletins, warnings, and reports of avalanche activity to assist communities of avalanche terrain users.

== Response and recovery ==
Avalanche mitigation organizations plan for, and respond to, avalanches. Typical responses span from clearing transportation corridors of avalanche debris, to repairing industrial and recreational facilities, to search, rescue, and recovery. To improve the outcome of human avalanche involvement avalanche control organizations offer training and education to both professionals and recreational amateurs in avalanche preparedness.

=== Professional preparedness ===
Professional responses to avalanches are targeted at avalanches involving the general unprepared public. When avalanches are forecast to occur, avalanche terrain to which the general unprepared public is exposed will be closed, and after the avalanches have occurred the area is cleared of debris, and repaired. When unexpected avalanches occur that involve the general unprepared public, avalanche control organizations respond with large professionally organized search teams involving probe lines, and trained search and rescue dogs.

=== Amateur preparedness ===
Recreational response to avalanches involves the rapid formation of an ad hoc search and rescue team. The ad hoc search and rescue teams rely on all the participants having prepared for a potential avalanche by carrying the correct search and rescue equipment, and undergoing the appropriate training.

== See also ==
- Cellular confinement
- Landslide mitigation, control of a similar disaster type
