= Snow fence =

Barrier to combat snowdrift

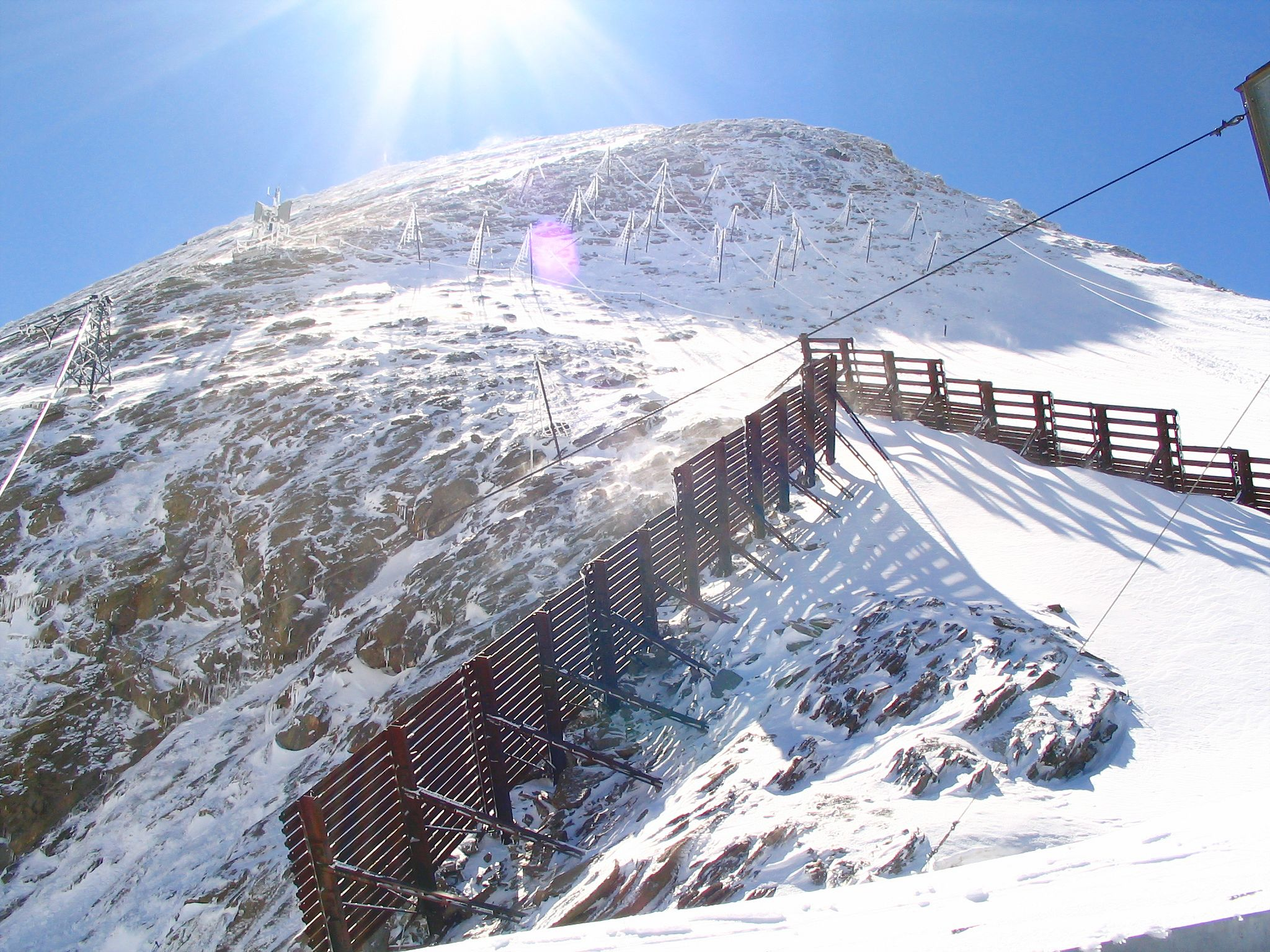
Snow fences on Kitzsteinhorn

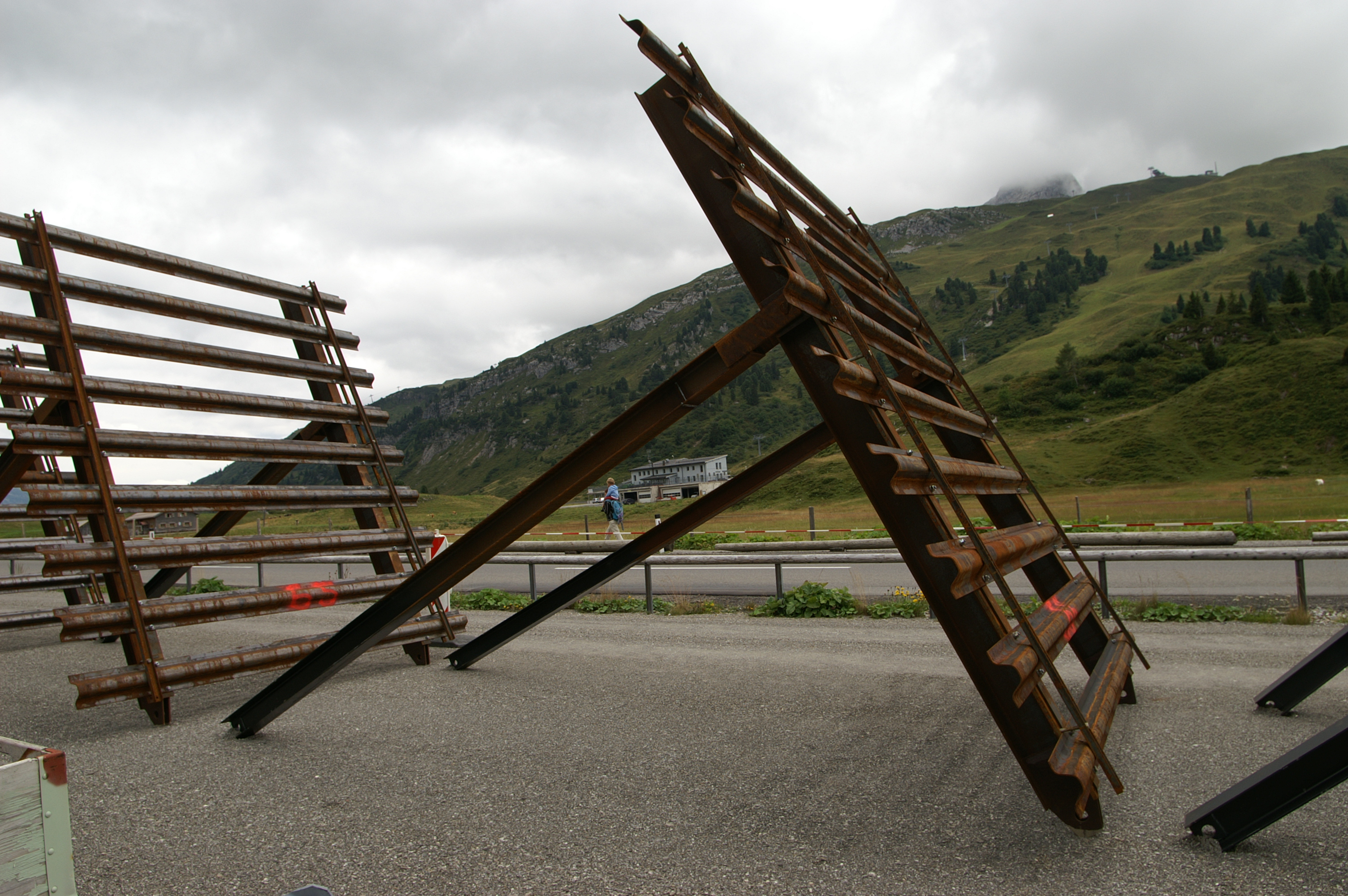
Avalanche protection in Austria

A snow fence, similar to a sand fence, is a barrier forcing windblown, drifting snow to accumulate in a desired place. Snow fences are employed primarily to minimize the amount of snowdrift on roadways and railways. Farmers and ranchers use snow fences to create drifts in basins for a ready spring water supply. Ski resorts also use snow fences to increase snow depth in specified areas, or for avalanche control.

== Description and physical mechanism ==
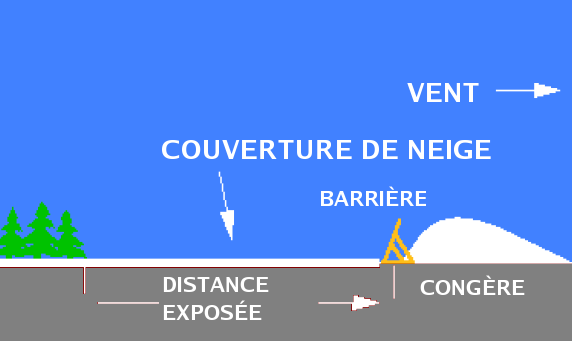
Diagram of effect (in French): Vent is wind direction, Congère is snow drift, Couverture de neige is snowcover.

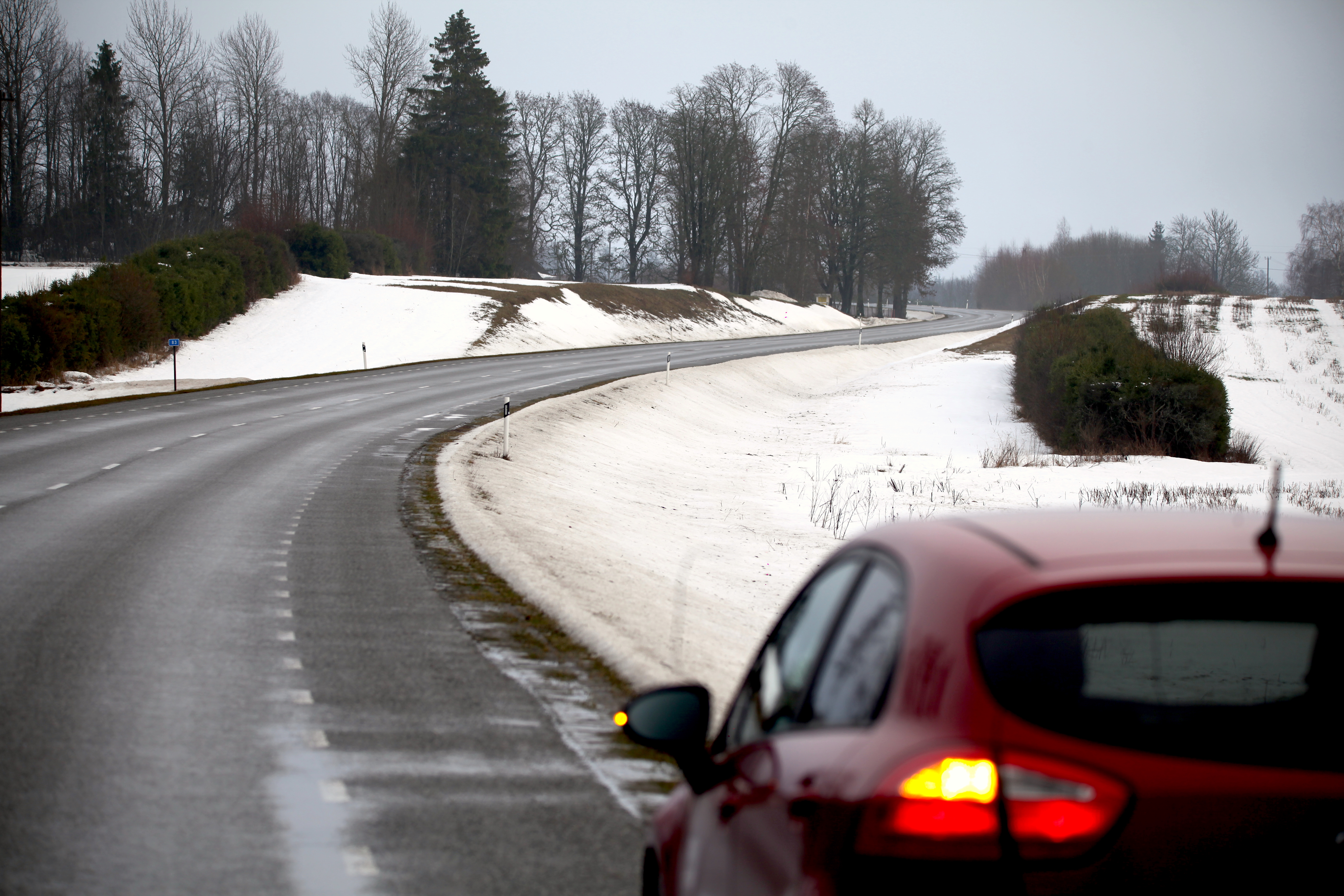
Fir hedges as living snow fences

Temporary snow fences are usually one of two varieties: perforated orange plastic sheeting attached to stakes at regular intervals (the type usually used for construction site fencing or temporary sports field fencing) or a cedar or other lightweight wood strip and wire fence, also attached to metal stakes. A permanent snow fence usually consists of poles with horizontal planks running across them to cover just over one-half of the total fence area. Taller fences trap more snow. Taking the height of the fence as one unit, it should be placed thirty-five units or more windward of the road or building it is meant to protect. Permanent snow fences can also consist of lines of closely spaced shrubs, conifer trees or maize stalks.

Snow fences work by causing turbulence in the wind, such that it drops much of its snow load on the lee side of the fence. Thus, snow fences cause snow drifts rather than preventing them. The fences are placed to cause snow to drift where beneficial or not harmful so that the snow does not drift onto undesired areas such as roads or buildings.

Snow fences have been reported to save lives and reduce maintenance costs. Snow and ice removal and control cost over $2 billion annually in the US. Studies published by Strategic Highway Research Program (SHRP) of National Research Council in 1991 showed that mechanical snow removal costs about 100 times more than trapping snow with fences.

Snow fences can also trap tumbleweeds.

== In Japan ==
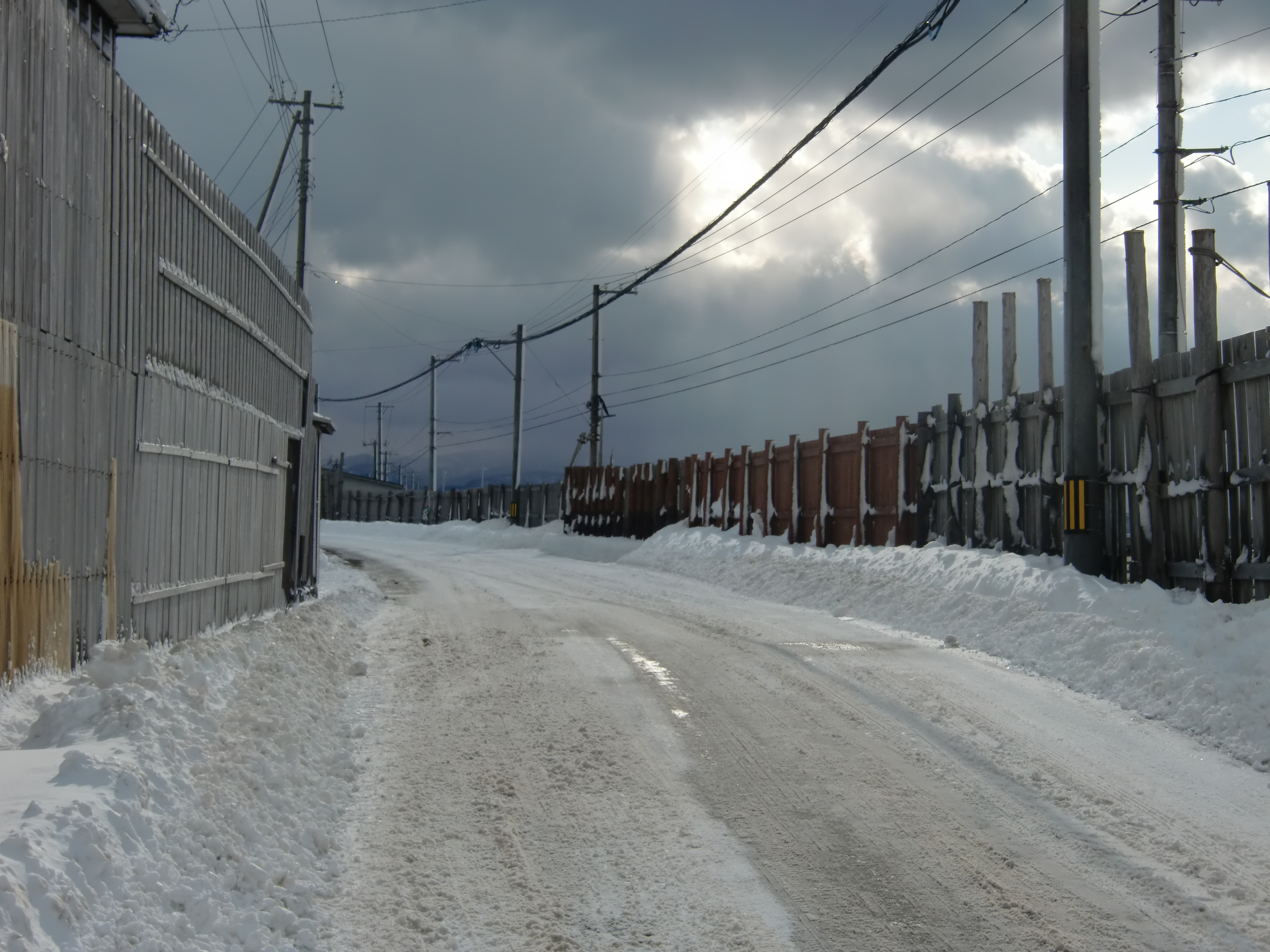
Yukigakoi (Old type snow fence in Japan)

In Tohoku and Hokkaido of Japan, especially in areas with strong wind and snow, such as the coastal areas of the Sea of Japan and the plains, structures that lead to snow fences called "Yukigakoi" made of reeds, chives, and wooden boards have been made for a long time. Even now, the culture of making "Yukigakoi" can be seen in some areas such as Hokkaido.

As for transportation facilities, wooden fences made on railway lines in the 1880s as a measure against snowstorms began. However, initially, it was difficult to predict where the snowdrift would be formed, and it was impossible to control the snowdrift well. There was also a fire accident caused by the sparks generated by the steam locomotive due to the wooden structure, so it was unpopular. It is said that it has replaced the Railroad snow forest in Japan as well.

On the other hand, for roads, a structure called a "Blowing pool type snow fence" was studied and installed for the first time in 1961, referring to the wooden Snow fence used all over the world. Then, in 1967, the Hokkaido Regional Development Bureau Construction machinery workshop (at that time) developed a "blow-off snow fence" that began to be installed on national roads in 1969. Later, the Hokkaido Development Civil Engineering Research Institute (currently, Public Works Research Institute Cold Region Civil Engineering Research Institute) researched "Blow-up prevention type snow fence" and installed it in 1978, and further applied "Blow-up prevention type snow fence" to "Blowing-proof snow fence" from 1981 and since 1988. It came to be installed.

In recent Japanese railways, "blowing pool type" and "blowing-proof" snow fences have been re-evaluated for their usefulness based on the research results and achievements on the road so that they will be used again as railway snow protection measures.

== See also ==
- Snow guard, a device attached to roofs to prevent snow from falling on people below
- Snow shed, which is designed so that snow collects on top
