= Schneekragen =

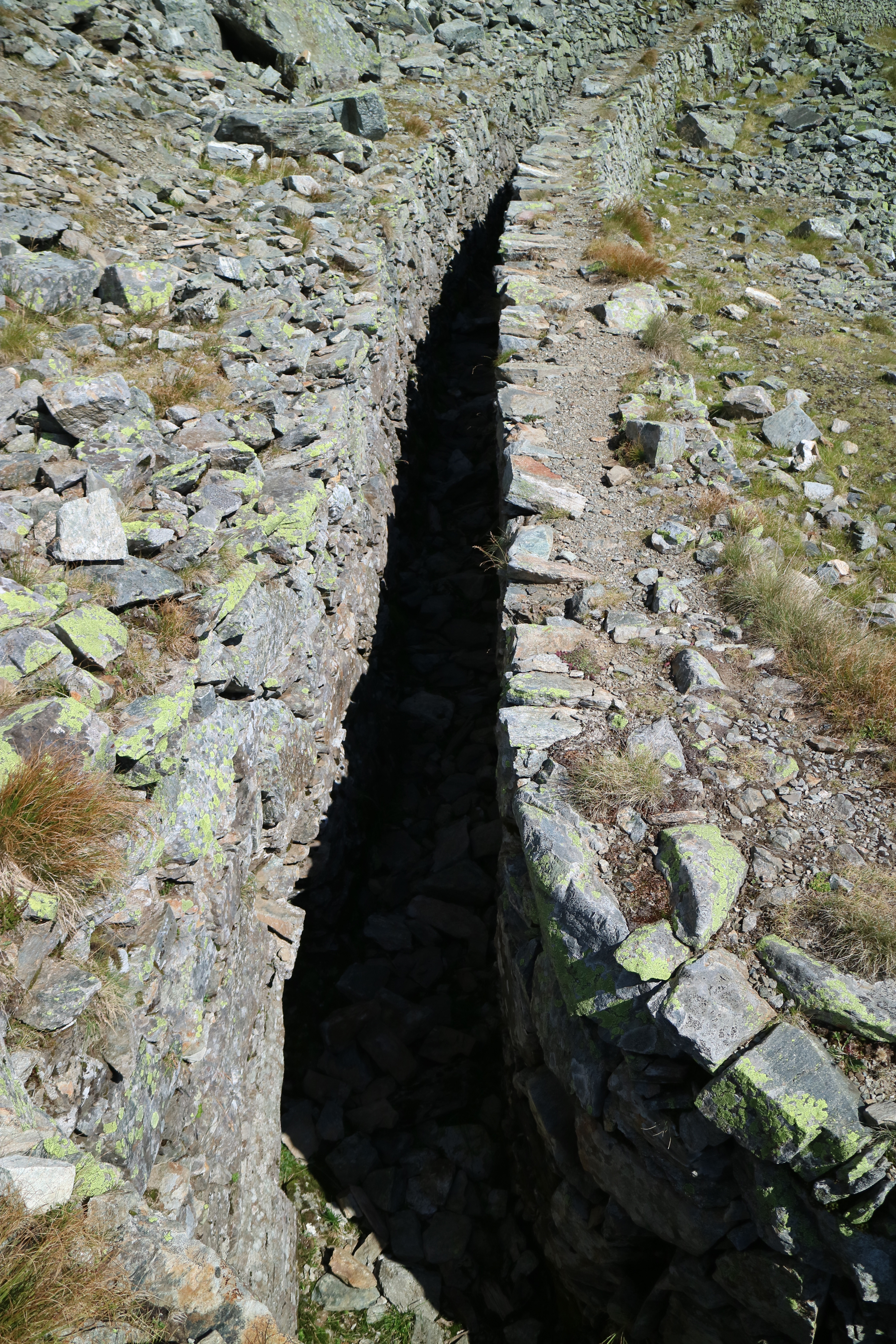
Exposed schneekragen in the Schladming Tauern, Austria

A schneekragen (German for snow collar) or schneehals (snow neck) was a safety corridor characteristic for alpine mining. Covered with lumbers or roundwood, it guaranteed somewhat avalanche-safe access to the adits during winter. Furthermore it protected the miners from cornices and ensured the passage of deep snow areas. Miners' houses, workshops and processing plants were often connected through a system of schneekragens with the adits, so the miners did not have to shovel. The corridors, often built of dry stone, barely reached man-high and had to be crossed cowered down or crawling. Because the entries were sometimes covered by cornices some schneekragens kept impassable and dynamite chests like other heavy equipment normally transported with horses had to be dragged through the danger zone.

Examples of schneekragens revitalized for tourism purposes can be found in the former gold- and silver mining rivers of the valleys of Rauris and Gastein (both Austria) as well as in the South Tyrolian mining settlement St. Martin am Schneeberg.

== Examples ==
- Zinkwand-Vöttern mining trail, Schladming Tauern
- Tauerngold mining trail at Neubau hut, Goldberg Group (Hohe Tauern)
- Bockhart, Goldberg Group (Hohe Tauern)
- Himmelreich mine, Schneeberg, Stubai Alps
- Veitstollen, Schneeberg, Stubai Alps
