= Snow guard =

Device that prevents snow and ice from sliding off roofs

Three-pipe snow fence system

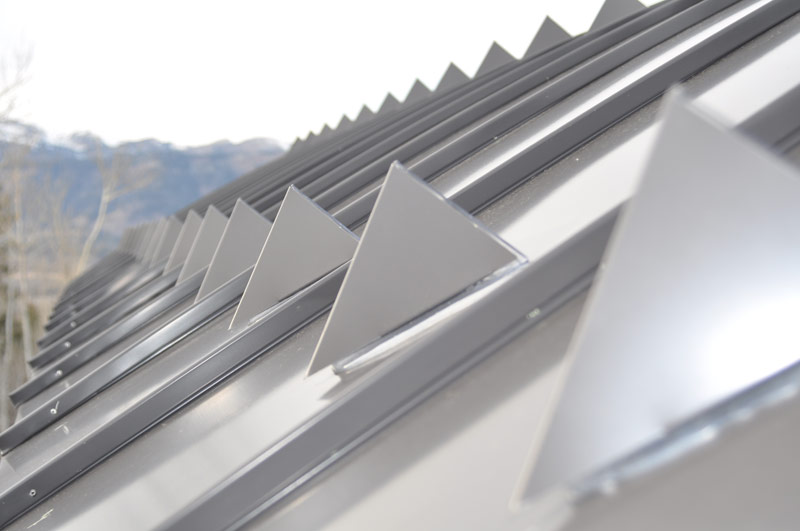
Snow guards in Jackson, Wyoming, United States

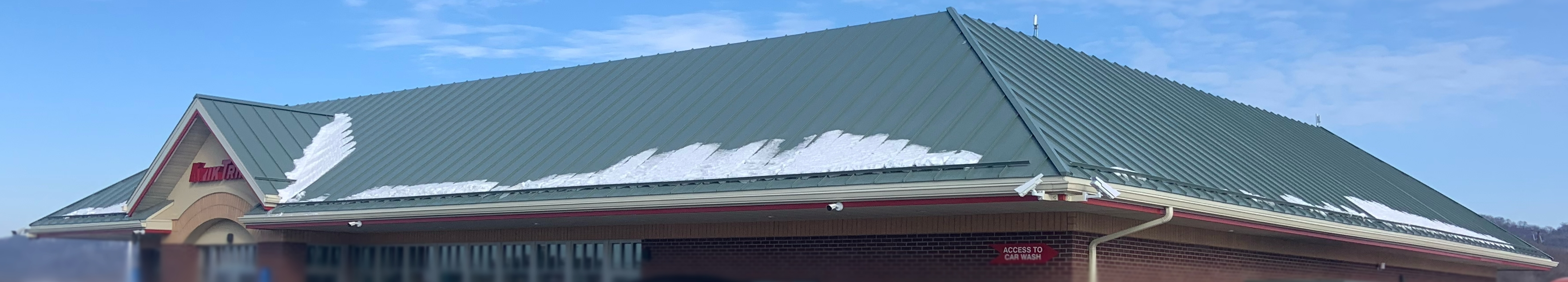
Standing seam metal roof with snow guards to keep snow from sliding off the roof too quickly

A snow guard is a device used to retain snow and ice from falling from one surface to a lower one; in contemporary usage, they are installed to prevent snow/ice pack from avalanching and damaging people, plants, and property below. They are most commonly installed in multiples or rows on a structure's roof surface, as a form of avalanche control. Snow guards are installed with a specific quantity and pattern based on the shape, size and pitch of the roof to provide the most uniform system of retention possible. Snow guards are not fully intended to completely hold back the snow as this would cause major leak issues when the snow melts. They are however built to separate the snow to allow it to break apart into smaller pieces/sections so that, if they do fall in rising temperatures and thawing conditions, the likelihood of having someone injured by the falling pile of snow is minimized.

Variants of snow guards have been used for over 300 years all around the world where seasonal snowfall is common. In addition to roofs, other larger natural or man-made objects and structures have also been used as snow guards (also known as snow fences) on steep sloping hills to lessen the effects of avalanches in valley regions.

Modern snow guards are made of polycarbonate and/or metals, depending on the type, size, and specific function of the guard. Although primarily installed for functional purposes, panel guards and snow railing are sometimes used to highlight a roof's aesthetic appeal and design. A variety of modern manufacturers have designed metal powder-coated guards that can match the colors of varying roof types, and snow rails are commonly colored to complement the roofs they protect. In addition, many manufacturers have developed snow guards and systems for metal roofs.

== Other names ==
Other commonly used names and terms for snow guards include:

- Snow bracket
- Snow brake
- Snow stop
- Snow shields
- Snow clip
- Ice guard
- Snow fence (non-highway type)
- Snow rail
- Snow pads
- Snow dogs
- Snow guard bracket

== See also ==
- Ice dam (roof)
