= Metal Construction Association =

- Formation: 1984
- Headquarters: Glenview, Illinois
- Executive vice president: Mark Engle
- Website: http://www.metalconstruction.org

The Metal Construction Association (MCA) is an industry organization in the US that was formed in 1984 with a focus on expanding the use of metal in construction through marketing, education and selective action on public policies that affect metal's use in building projects.

== History ==
The concept of the MCA began in March 1983 when members of the now-defunct Metal Building Component Manufacturers Association wanted to create a new, expanded association. MCA took shape later that year when seed money for the new organization was contributed by the companies American Building Components, Binkley Company, Corrugated Metal, Engineered Components, McElroy Metal, Metal Building Components Inc., Moncrief Lenoir and Omega Metal Building Products. The new organization was officially named the Metal Construction Association and its purpose was to promote the use of metal in all phases of construction and collectively oppose any legislation that deters its use.

That remains the essence of MCA's strategic focus - to grow the use of metal through marketing, education and selective action on public policies that affect metal's use in building projects.

In 1998, MCA helped to establish the Metal Roofing Alliance, a national marketing initiative that has helped to achieve MCA goals in the residential market. It is a separately run entity closely aligned with MCA activities. In 2002, MCA worked with the American Iron and Steel Institute and the Metal Building Manufacturers Association (among others) as part of the Steel Coalition. In 2004, MCA launched The Metal Initiative, a program that educates decision makers and influencers in the commercial building market.
