= Metal Building Manufacturers Association =

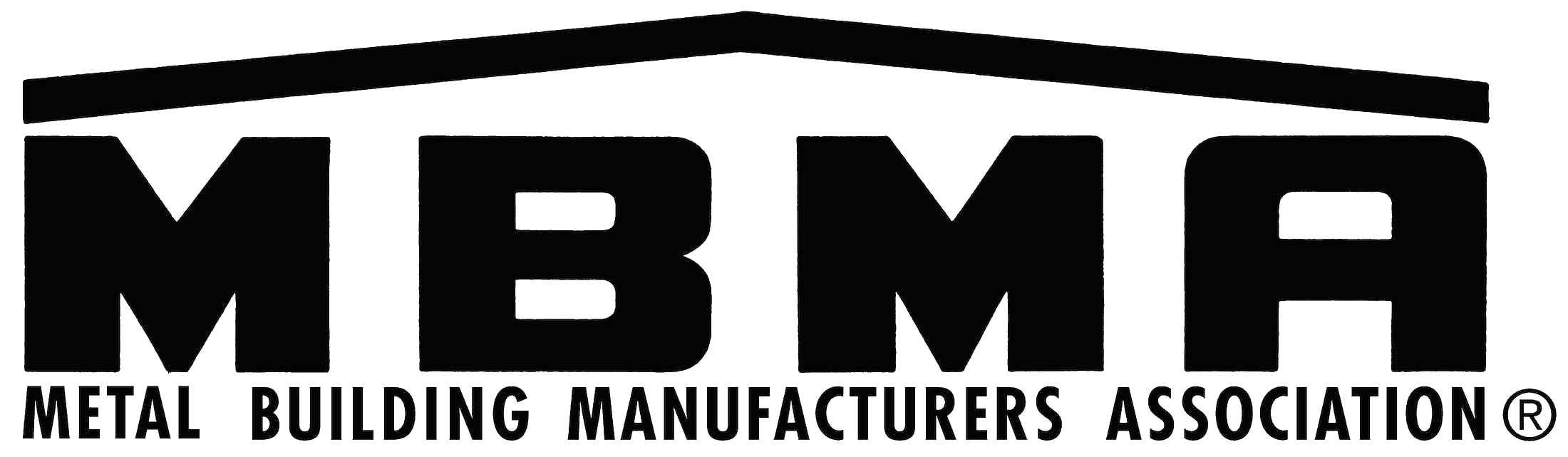
- Abbreviation: MBMA
- Formation: 1956; 70 years ago
- Headquarters: Cleveland, Ohio, United States
- Coordinates: 41°29′51.41″N 81°40′50.326″W
- Services: MBMA is a trade association that promotes the metal building systems industry.
- Key people: Tony Bouquot; General Manager
- Website: mbma.com

The Metal Building Manufacturers Association (MBMA) was founded in 1956 and promotes the design and construction of metal building systems in the low-rise, nonresidential building marketplace. A nonprofit trade organization, MBMA's headquarters is in Cleveland, Ohio. The organization consists of Building Systems members that are certified according to standards that have been set by the International Accreditation Service, and Associate members that work in the metal building industry. MBMA has a general manager, and it has a chairman and Board of Directors who are elected by members on an annual basis.

== MBMA History ==
The Metal Building Manufacturers Association, commonly known as the MBMA, was founded in 1956 by a group of companies that designed, manufactured, and marketed metal buildings. The first group of 13 metal building systems companies came together under the leadership of Wilbur B. Larkin in order to work together to promote metal building systems and be the technical voice of the industry.

Early in the 1900s, prior to the formation of the MBMA, metal beams and panels were used for garages with small structures and were advertised for sale in publications such as the Saturday Evening Post. The first standing seam metal roof was introduced by Armco Steel Corp at the 1934 Century of Progress Exposition in Chicago. The use of pre-engineered buildings increased during World War II with the introduction and evolution of the Quonset Hut, a portable and inexpensive solution to housing and other needs. After the war, metal buildings became more widely accepted for other uses.

During the 1950s, metal building manufacturers began to use a builder/dealer network model. The builders provided contracting and erection services and the manufacturers offered training courses for the building of their structures. At that time, Wilber Larkin of Butler Manufacturing wrote to a number of companies and invited them to a meeting in Chicago.

On September 25, 1956, 13 companies officially formed the Metal Building Manufacturers Association. The charter took effect on October 1, 1956, with Armco Steel Corp., Behlen Manufacturing, Butler Manufacturing, Carew Steel, Cowin & Company Inc., Inland-Ryerson Construction Products Company/INRYCO INC., Marathon Metallic Building Company, Martin Steel Buildings Inc., National Steel Products Company/Stran-Steel, Pascoe Steel, Soule Steel, Steelcraft Manufacturing and Wonder Building Corp as the original members.

MBMA member sales were $69.6 million in 1956. The association and its membership grew throughout the late 1950s, and each decade after that. In 1960, member sales were $98.6 million and they shipped approximately 260,000 tons of steel. There were 16 members in 1960, and in 1968 the Metal Building Dealers Association was formed.

In 1970, the MBMA had 25 members with sales of $363 million. This decade saw the industry advance through a number of new developments. The standing seam roof system came into wide production and use during these years. Additionally, modern coating systems for both metal roofs and walls allowed metal buildings to incorporate a variety of colors. During this decade, the association hired its first full-time director of research and engineering - Dr. Duane Ellifritt, a former engineer with Armco and then on the faculty of Oklahoma State University.

In 1980, member sales climbed to over $1 billion with steel shipments exceeding 1 million tons. Metal Building News became the industry's first tabloid-size trade publication when it began publishing in 1980. It is now called Metal Construction News, and in 1985, a second industry magazine began publishing, Metal Architecture.

In 1990 MBMA member sales exceeded $1.5 billion and steel shipped was over 1.2 million tons. By 2000, MBMA member sales were over $2.5 billion and steel shipments were in excess of 1.875 million tons. Sales and shipments fell after the 2008 recession, but have since rebounded.

The retail giant, Costco, first tested using metal buildings for its outlets in 1990. The test worked; since then the retailer has used metal buildings for 90% of its warehouse stores. Costco management has said it can build a metal warehouse in 110 days, contrasted with 160 to 180 days for a traditional structure.

== Engineered metal building systems ==
=== Research and development ===
When MBMA was founded, a Technical Committee was established and began to research and document important issues in metal building design and construction. The first publication of the new association was the MBMA Recommended Design Practices Manual, introduced in 1959.

The Technical Committee helped promote and add its expertise to research being undertaken by other groups, such as the American Iron and Steel Institute's work at Cornell University that led to the publication of Design of Light Gauge Steel Diaphragms in 1967. MBMA first co-sponsored research in 1966 with a study on tapered structural members conducted at the State University of New York at Buffalo by Dr. George Lee.

In 1974, MBMA began sponsoring wind load research to resolve differences in various standards and codes. The then-current American National Standards Institute, or ANSI, standard was based on high-rise buildings and was not appropriate for low-rise structures. This was not simply an issue for metal buildings, but all low-rise non-residential construction.

Head of Walls: MBMA and the American Iron and Steel Institute (AISI) sponsored fire protection tests on head of wall (HOW) joints in metal buildings. This work was performed at Underwriters Laboratories and was designed to show the fire resistive nature of the HOW joints in metal buildings. The tests resulted in three new UL Certifications (HW-D-0488, HW-D-0489, and HW-D-0490), as well as further clarification from the UL for those who work with fire rated walls and unrated ceiling assemblies.

Hot Box Testing: Buildings consume approximately 40 percent of energy used in the United States annually. The MBMA is working with the Oak Ridge National Laboratory (ORNL) in Tennessee to create more energy-efficient structures. ORNL's Large Scale Climate Simulator (LSCS) can enclose building assemblies to replicate different climatic conditions and provide “hot box” testing in accordance with ASTM C1363

MBMA is currently working with ORNL on next-generation roofing assemblies that have been designed to increase energy efficiency, primarily by using unique combinations of insulation. ORNL provides expertise on heat-transfer fundamentals and helps to target areas to improve. Recently, MBMA started working with ORNL on the Flexible Research Platform project. This work is helping to make metal building systems more efficient and keep the industry ahead of code requirements.

Overhead Doors and Metal Buildings: MBMA has been working with the Door and Access System Manufacturers Association (DASMA) for the past several years to create better doors and openings for metal buildings. Five years of collaboration and research has focused on rolling steel overhead doors and the effects of wind on the doors and the building. As a result of this collective effort in the summer of 2010, DASMA released a technical guide to ensure that metal building framing can adequately support a rolling door.

The MBMA continues to perform research into wind loads on metal buildings, roof systems, and other aspects of low-rise construction. Additionally, the association has sponsored and led research into bolted end plate connections, cold-formed steel, snow loads and wind uplift, and insurance issues for metal buildings, among other topics that are pertinent to the industry.

== Education ==
The MBMA educates members of the building community, including designers, engineers, architects, erectors, contractors, and code officials about metal building systems. It works with various groups and associations to keep code officials apprised of the advances in metal building systems and how they apply to the building codes. The association also works to educate members and other parts of the building community on best practices and how to apply research and design improvements in their work. The MBMA offers educational resources that can be downloaded for free.

The MBMA Media channel on YouTube.com offers a variety of videos and recorded webinars on topics of interest, including design, construction, testing, research and accreditation.

=== Student competition ===
For the second straight year, students from the University of Massachusetts Amherst Department of Architecture have won the top prizes in the MBMA’s Student Design Competition. The students and their advisors were awarded total prizes of $28,000 in a competition that included 33 entries from six colleges. This was the third year for the competition.

== Publications ==
The MBMA offers various publications. The following is a list of some of the notable publications of the association.

Metal Building Systems Manual: The Metal Building Systems Manual is updated regularly to reflect the latest iteration of the International Building Code (IBC) and other updated codes. The Metal Building Systems Manual includes important topics for metal buildings such as load application, crane loads, fire ratings information and energy conservation. It also has material on common industry practices, guide specifications and climatological data for the entire United States. The Metal Building Systems Manual is available in both PDF and printed versions, and is published by MBMA.

Metal Roofing Systems Design Manual: The Metal Roofing Systems Design Manual is a comprehensive guide for working with metal roofing. It includes sections and chapters on roofing system components; substrate support for metal roofing systems; metal roof performance guide specifications; a listing of ASTM standards related to metal roofing systems; common roof retrofit applications; metal roofing common industry practices; design practices and examples; installation and maintenance of roofing system; roof fire ratings; fasteners, with types and applications; climatological data by U.S. County; and metal roofing details. The latest edition of the Metal Roofing Systems Design Manual includes current codes, standards and common industry practices.

Seismic Design Manual: The illustrated guide includes narratives about metal building systems, examples of realistic design situations, engineering diagrams, and code commentary. It references the International Building Code, the American Society of Civil Engineers’ Minimum Design Loads for Buildings and Other Structures ASCE/SEI Standard 7. Structural steel design is based on the American Institute of Steel Construction’s Specification for Structural Steel Buildings Standard AISC 360 and the Seismic Provisions for Steel Buildings Standard AISC 341.

MBMA Fire and Insurance Bulletins: These are a series of fire and insurance bulletins that the association created and updates to help building officials and builders understand the insurance and fire protection issues associated with metal buildings and low-rise construction.

Guide for Inspecting Metal Building Systems: The MBMA Guide for Inspecting Metal Building Systems is a guide intended for use by individuals who are responsible for contracting, performing, and reporting the various inspection tasks related to the construction of a metal building project. These individuals may be representatives of the owners, design professionals, general contractors, erectors, or building officials. Depending on the project and jurisdiction, there may be building code and contractually required inspections, as well as other optional inspections such as owner acceptance and insurance evaluation. This Guide should provide a useful resource for when inspecting a metal building project.

Energy Design Guide for Metal Building Systems, Second Edition: The MBMA Energy Design Guide for Metal Building Systems has an overview of metal and sustainable buildings followed by detailed chapters on insulation, cool roofs and daylighting. There are also chapters devoted to the International Energy Conservation Code, ASHRAE Standards and state energy codes, as well as compliance tools. Detailed information is provided on the most prominent rating programs, such as the USGBC's Leadership in Energy and Environmental Design(LEED), Green Globes and Energy Star.

Fire Resistance Design Guide for Metal Building Systems: The Fire Resistance Design Guide for Metal Building Systems offers information on how to effectively use metal buildings to meet the fire resistance requirements of a project. It serves as a reference guide for fire protection issues related to metal building systems, such as fire test standards, shape properties for fire resistance, repair/replacement after fire damage, and much more.

== See also ==
- Metal Construction Association
- Metal Building Contractors & Erectors Association
