= Steven Peck =

Steven or Steve Peck may refer to:

- Steven L. Peck (born 1957), American evolutionary biologist, blogger, poet and novelist
- Steven W. Peck, American president of Green Roofs for Healthy Cities which he founded in 1999

== See also ==
- Stephen M. Peck (1935 – 2004), American investor and philanthropist
