= Sod roof =

Traditional Scandinavian type of grass roof

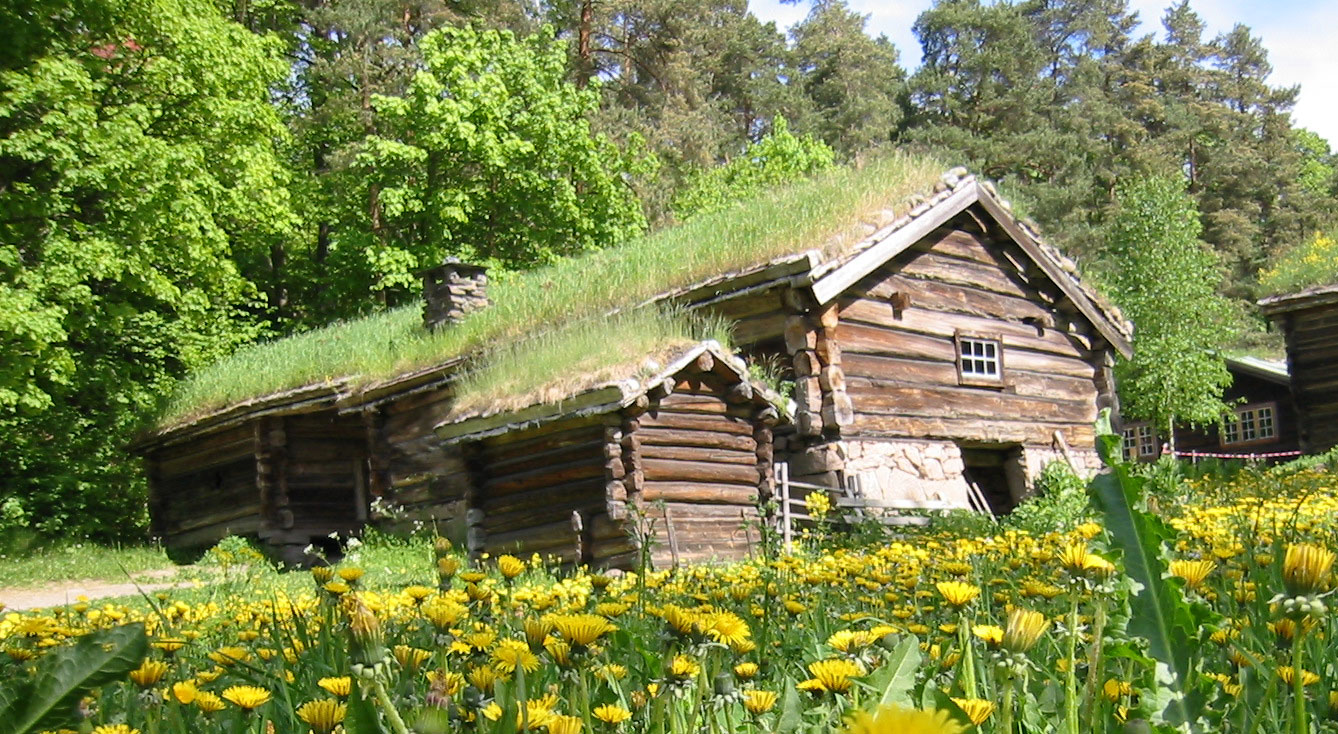
Sod roofs on log buildings of Norsk Folkemuseum in Oslo

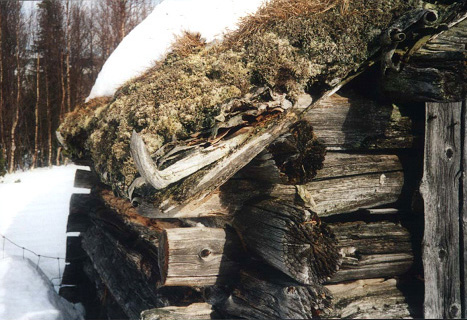
Old sod roof in disrepair, Hemsedal, Norway. Photo: Roede

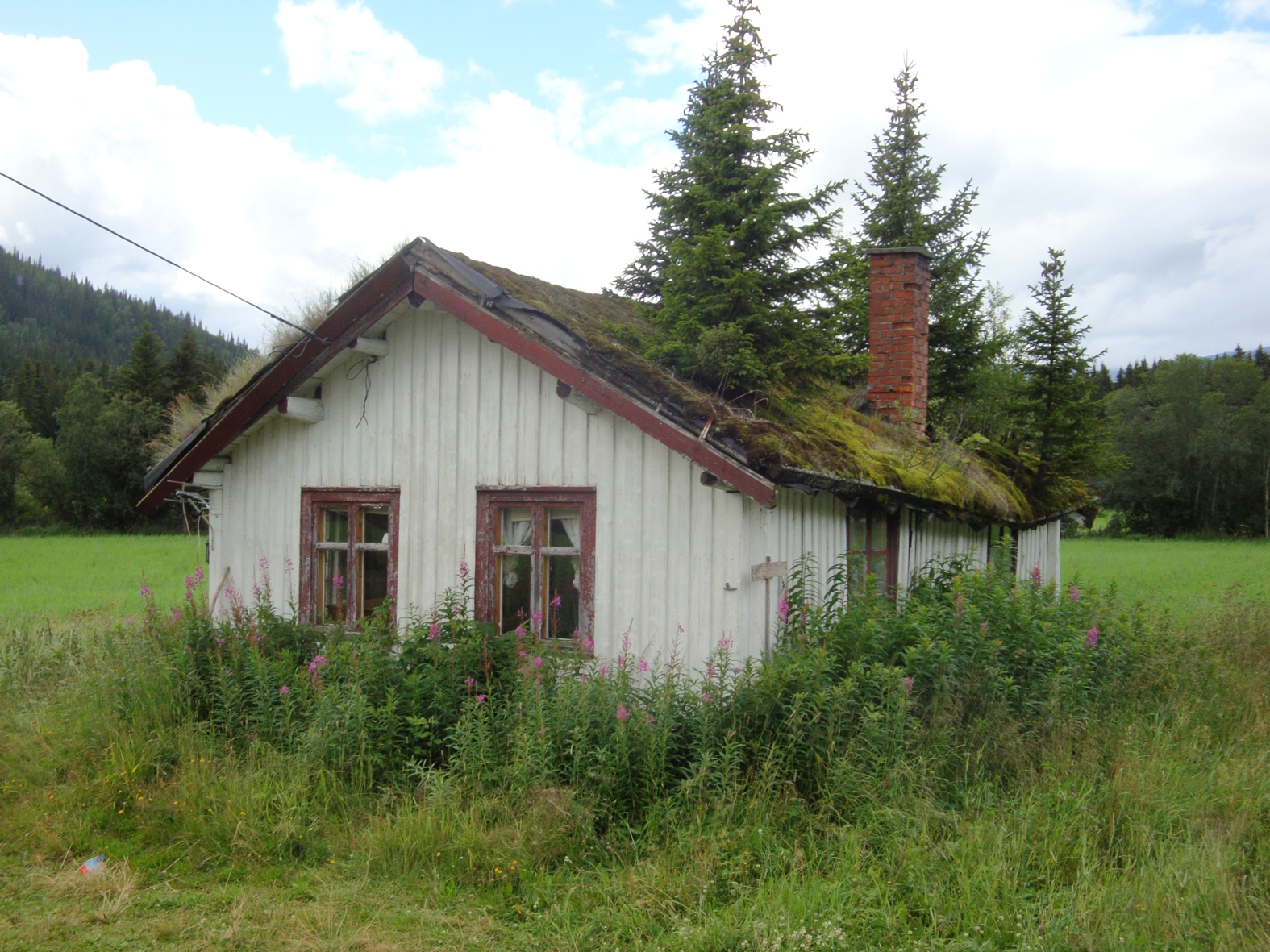
House in Hemsedal in immediate need of repair. Trees will soon destroy a sod roof. Photo: Roede

A sod roof, or turf roof, is a traditional Scandinavian type of green roof covered with sod on top of several layers of birch bark on gently sloping wooden roof boards. Until the late 19th century, it was the most common roof on rural log houses in Norway and large parts of the rest of Scandinavia. Its distribution roughly corresponds to the distribution of the log building technique in the vernacular architecture of Finland and the Scandinavian peninsula. The load of approximately 250 kg per m^{2} of a sod roof is an advantage because it helps to compress the logs and make the walls more draught-proof. In winter the total load may well increase to 400 or 500 kg per m^{2} because of snow. Sod is also a reasonably efficient insulator in a cold climate. The birch bark underneath ensures that the roof will be waterproof.

The term ‘sod roof’ is somewhat misleading, as the active, water-tight element of the roof is birch bark. The main purpose of the sod is to hold the birch bark in place. The roof might just as well have been called a "birch bark roof", but its grassy outward appearance is the reason for its name in Scandinavian languages: Norwegian and Swedish torvtak, Danish tørvetag, Icelandic torfþak.

A sod roof is well suited to the dynamics of a barter economy because the materials are ubiquitous and cost nothing, although the work is labour-intensive. However, a typical household in the era that sod roofs were most common would usually have a lot of people to do the work, and neighbours would typically be invited to take part in the roofing party, similar to a barn raising in the United States. The Norwegian term dugnad denotes an established custom, where large undertakings were accomplished with help from the community.

== History ==
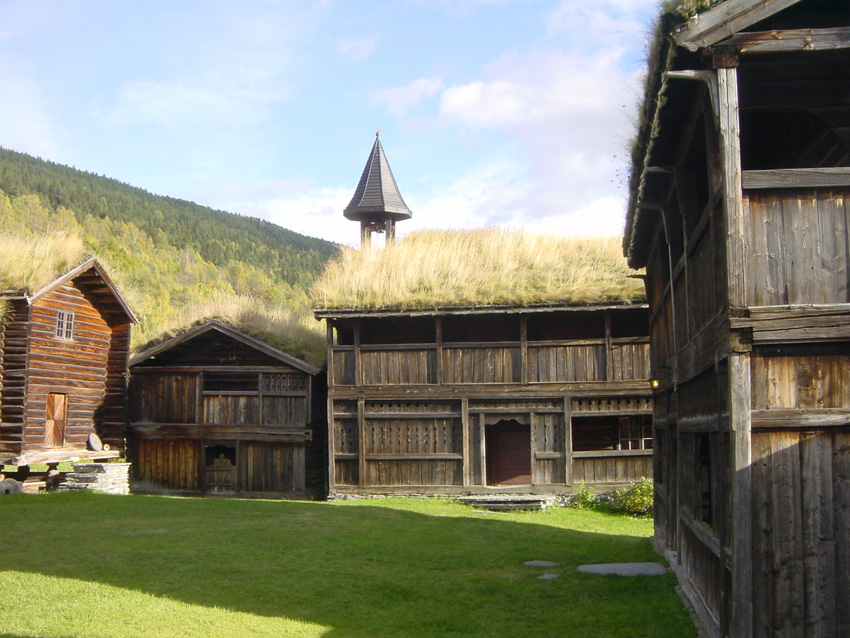
Sod roofs on farmhouses in Gudbrandsdal, Norway. Photo: Roede

Roofs in Scandinavia have probably been covered with birch bark and sod since prehistory. During the Viking and Middle Ages, most houses had sod roofs, while churches and other buildings with steeper roofs were covered with boards, wood shingles, or lead.

In rural areas, sod roofs were almost universal until the early 18th century. Tile roofs, which appeared much earlier in towns and on rural manors, gradually replaced sod roofs except in remote inland regions during the 19th century. Corrugated iron and other industrial materials also threatened these ancient traditions. However, just before disappearing, national romanticism revived vernacular styles, including sod roofs. A new market emerged with the demand for mountain lodges and holiday homes, while open-air museums and preservation movements helped protect traditional building methods.

From these roots, sod roofs have begun to reappear as an alternative to modern materials. The more recent idea of the green roof developed independently, but it benefits from the experience gained through centuries of Scandinavian tradition.

== Birch bark ==
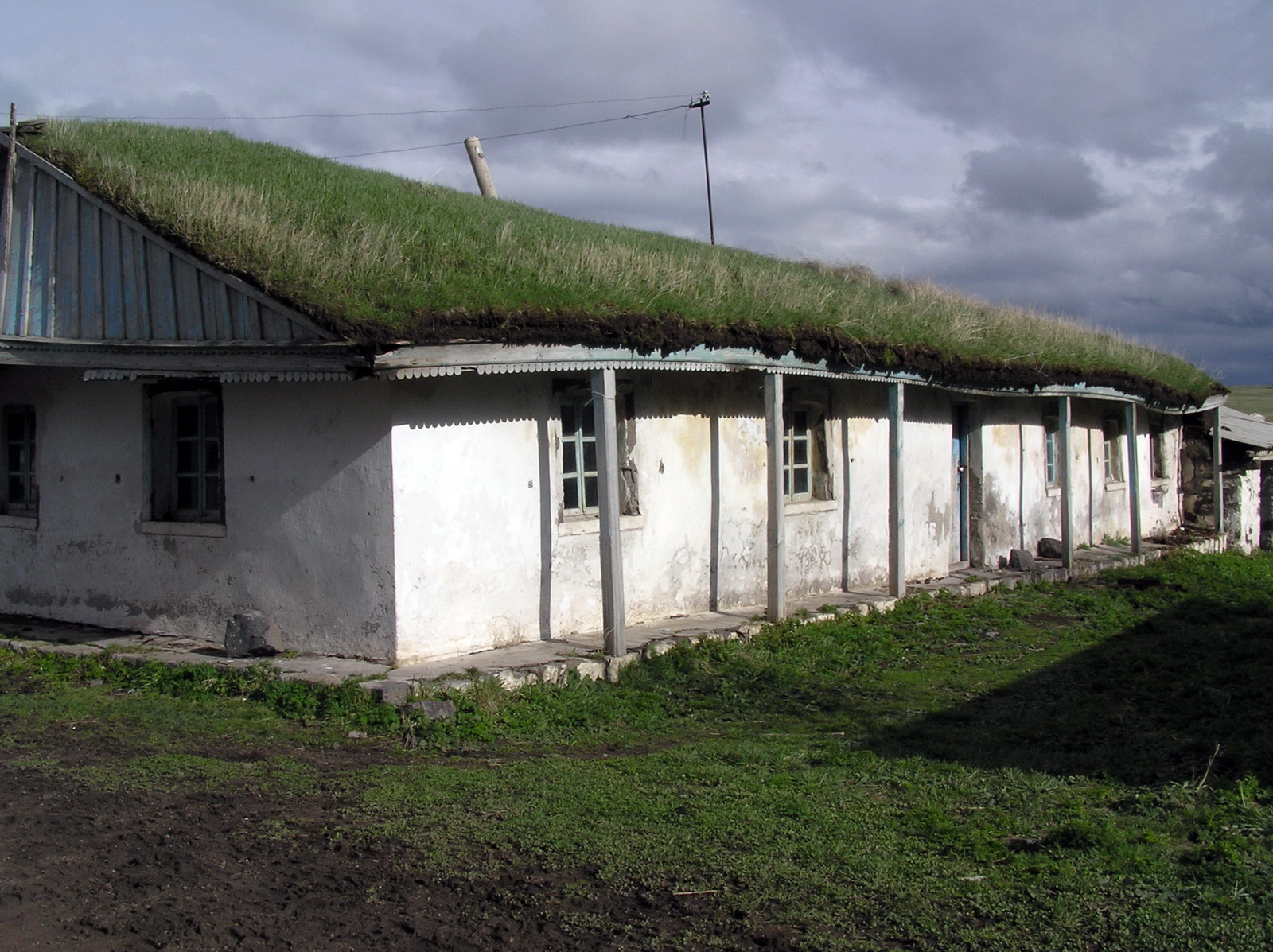
Doukhobor house in Yefremovka, Georgia, with a sod roof

Birch bark is eminently suitable as a roof covering because it is strong, water-resistant and soil-resistant enough to last for generations, although 30 years was considered the normal lifespan of a sod roof in most places. Birch is common everywhere in Northern Europe, and its bark is easily stripped from the trunk in spring or early summer, while the sap is running. One incision with a knife lengthwise down the trunk between two branches will produce a correspondingly wide sheet, its length equal to the circumference. The outer, flaky (white) bark is pried loose from the inner (green or brown) layer, the bast. Removing the bast will cause the tree to die, but removing the outer bark will not harm the tree, although the scar will remain for many years. A new, coarser bark will replace the stripped bark.

The sheets of bark must be stored flat under pressure to prevent curling. Left alone, a sheet will curl up into a tight roll, in the opposite direction of the natural curve of the trunk.

The bark is laid inside up directly onto the roof boards without any nails or other means of fastening. On roughly hewn or sawn roof boards, the friction alone will hold the layers of birch bark in place. They must, however, be weighted down with a heavier material to prevent them from curling or blowing away. Planks of split logs have been used, but sod has an additional advantage because it is a far better insulator.

Bark sheets were laid from the eaves upward, overlapping like shingles, and straddling the ridge. 6 layers of birch bark were considered adequate, but up to 16 layers have been recorded in roofs of high quality. The first layers project about 8 cm along the eaves, where they will curve down around the edge of the outer board to form a throating. Extra long sheets will straddle the roof ridge.

== Sod ==
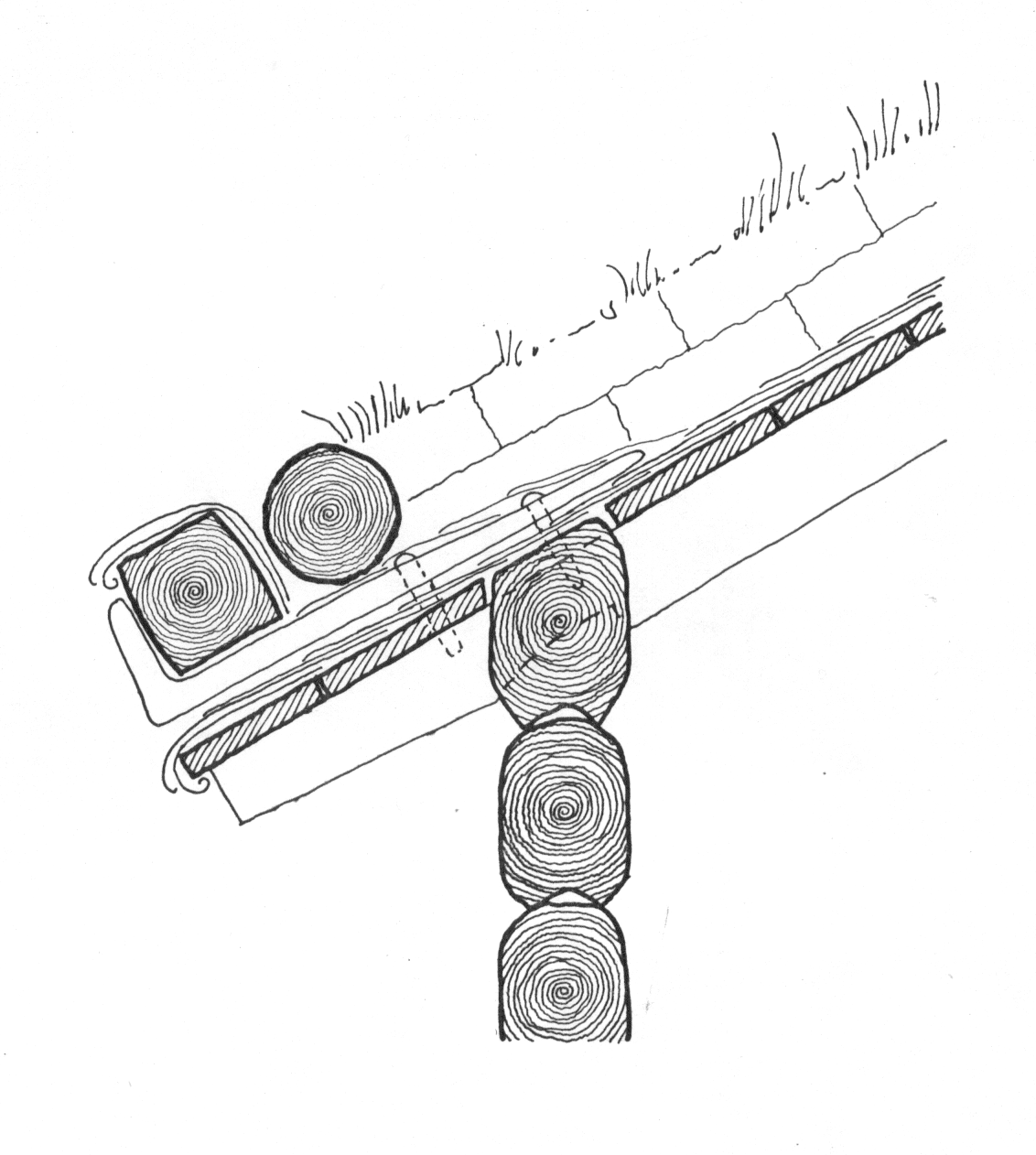
Section of a traditional sod roof with a "turf log" held by wooden hooks and an additional "sacrificial" log behind

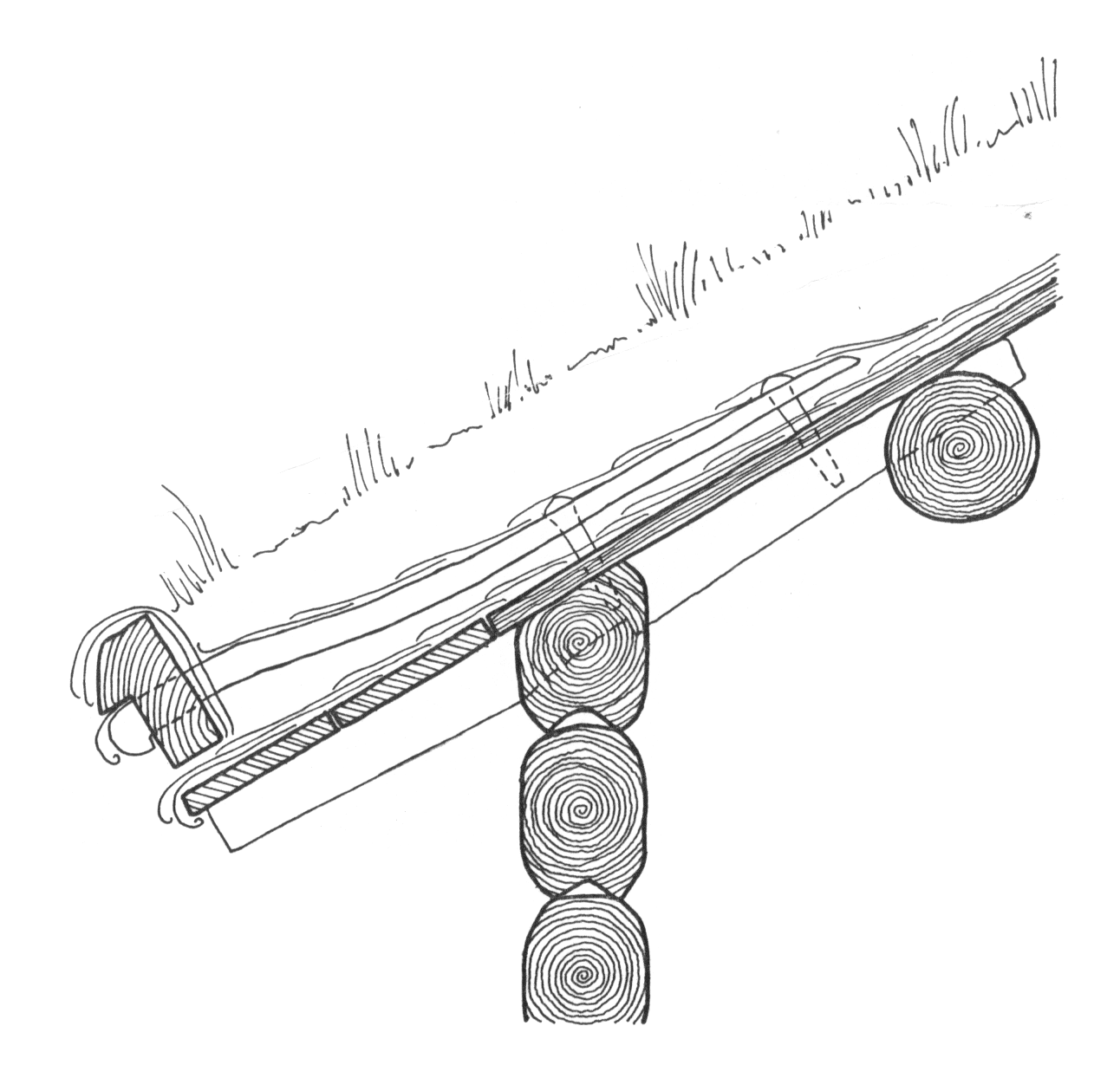
Section of a Gudbrandsdal-type sod roof with elaborate "turf log"

Sod or turf for roofing was cut from good pasture land, preferably with sandy soil. A naturally grown grass with a deep root system was desirable. The turf was cut into portable pieces, each about one foot (30 cm) square and about three inches (7.5 cm) thick, half the thickness of the finished covering. It was hoisted or carried up on the roof, or on a scaffolding.

Pieces of sod must be laid out immediately after the birch bark, to keep it in place. For this reason, the process must be carefully coordinated. Two workers will usually cooperate on the same strip of the roof, wide enough to be comfortably within reach. One will lay out the bark, the other will put sod on top.

The first layer of sod was traditionally placed with the grass down, as the wilted grass would protect the bark from acidic humus and act as a drain. The grass of the second layer faced upwards to establish a solid surface. Grass roots would eventually permeate the bottom layer to create one solid structure. The finished roof would in time look just like a flower-studded meadow.

A total thickness of about 15 cm is enough to make the sod survive a dry summer. More than 20 cm is superfluous, and the weight would be excessive. If the sod is too shallow, a severe drought will kill the vegetation, causing erosionsoil creep. Most of Scandinavia has enough precipitation to let an established root system survive an occasional dry spell. In very dry areas, it was customary to cultivate certain drought-resistant plants – notably Rhodiola rosea, Allium fistulosum and Sempervivum tectorum.

== Sod support along the eaves and verges ==
To stay in place, the sod must be supported by strong beams along the eaves. These logs or beams (Norwegian: torvvol) come in a variety of shapes and sizes, depending on the quality and status of the building, and on local tradition. An equivalent English term would be turf log.

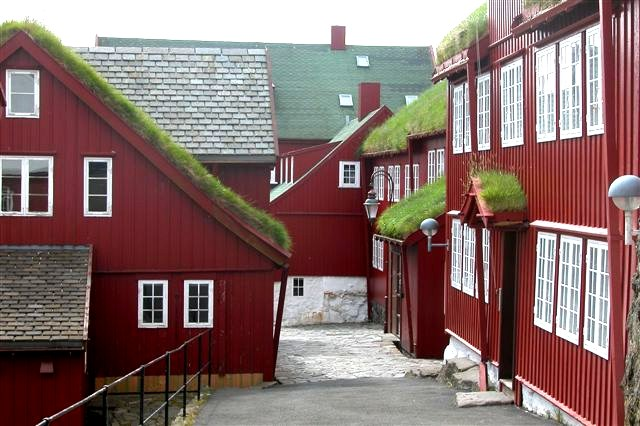
A more urban example in Tórshavn, capital of the Faroe Islands (autonomous territory of the Kingdom of Denmark)

The most common turf log is an undressed fir log 5 to 6 inches across. Also fairly common are squared timbers of similar size. In some districts planks raised on edge were used. Other traditions called for a more elaborate cross section with the appearance of a fascia, approaching "real" architecture.

The turf log was fastened to the roof boards and underlying rafters with naturally grown wooden hooks, preferably from durable juniper. The hooks were fastened with wooden pegs and covered by additional sheets of birch bark. Turf logs are also known to have been held in place by rafters hewn from logs with one root branch left to form a bracket. This method made for extremely cumbersome maintenance. When the brackets disintegrated, one would have to tear up the whole roof to renew all the rafters. A more refined fastening device was the kolv, an elaborately shaped stick of wood, around 60 cm long, pegged to the roof and extended through a hole in the turf log. Its wider protruding head would hold the log in place.

Erosion at the verges was in some districts prevented by means of similar logs, sometimes joined crosswise at the gable top. More common was a row of rocks gathered from the fields. Verge boards were not a feature of ancient log buildings with sod roofs, but were introduced during the 17th and 18th centuries through influence from urban architecture with tile roofs.

== Modern turf roofs ==
In modern turf roof construction, bitumen roofing felt combined with dimpled plastic drainage membranes are usually used in place of birch bark. Bitumen roofing felt is nailed to the sarking and a dimpled cavity drainage membrane is laid over the top (dimples face down) to form a drainage layer. The turf is then laid over this drainage layer. Turf roofs are still widely used on newly built cabins in Norway.

== See also ==
- Sod house
- Vernacular architecture
- Roof garden
