= Green roof =

Roof covered with vegetation

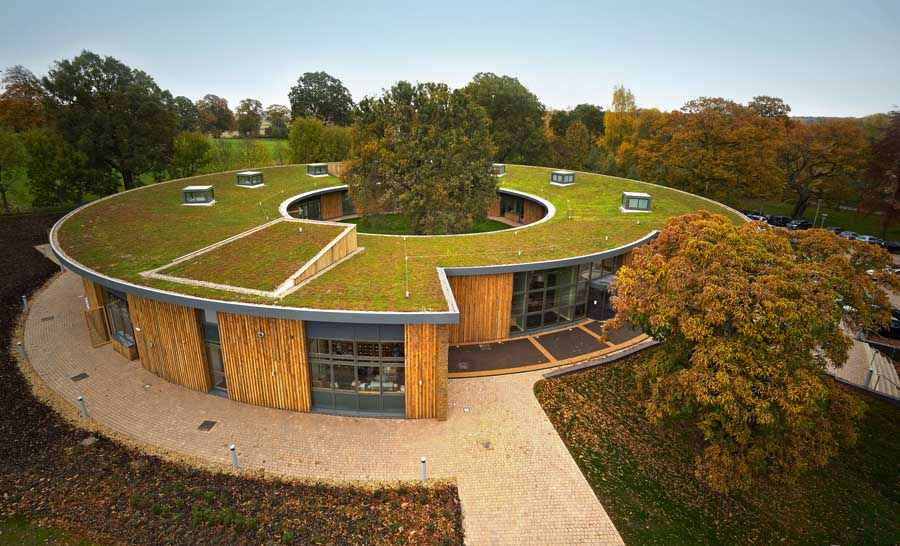
Green roof at the British Horse Society headquarters.

A green roof or living roof is a roof of a building that is partially or completely covered with vegetation and a growing medium, planted over a waterproofing membrane. It may also include additional layers such as a root barrier and drainage, and irrigation systems. Container gardens on roofs, where plants are maintained in pots, are not generally considered to be true green roofs, although this is debated. Rooftop ponds are another form of green roofs, which are used to treat greywater. Vegetation, soil, drainage layer, root barrier, and irrigation system constitute the green roof.

Green roofs serve several purposes for a building, such as absorbing rainwater, providing insulation, creating a habitat for wildlife, and decreasing stress of the people around the roof by providing a more aesthetically pleasing landscape, and helping to lower urban air temperatures and mitigate the heat island effect. Green roofs are suitable for retrofit or redevelopment projects as well as new buildings and can be installed on small garages or larger industrial, commercial and municipal buildings. They effectively use the natural functions of plants to filter water and treat air in urban and suburban landscapes. There are two types of green roof: intensive roofs, which are thicker, with a minimum depth of 12.8 cm (5 1/16 in), and can support a wider variety of plants but are heavier and require more maintenance, and extensive roofs, which are shallow, ranging in depth from 2 to 12.7 cm (13/16 to 5 in), lighter than intensive green roofs, and require minimal maintenance.

The term green roof may also be used to indicate roofs that use some form of green technology, such as a cool roof, a roof with solar thermal collectors or photovoltaic panels. Green roofs are also referred to as eco-roofs, oikosteges, vegetated roofs, living roofs, greenroofs and VCP_{H} (Horizontal Vegetated Complex Partitions).

== Environmental benefits ==
=== Thermal reduction and energy conservation ===
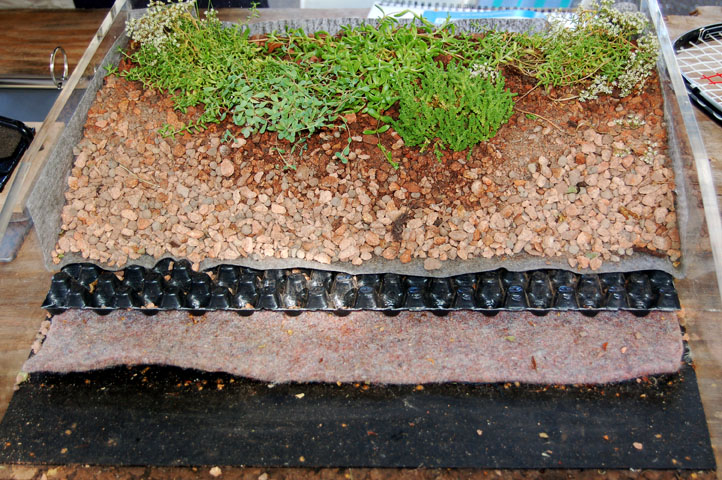
Model of layers and components used in some green roof systems.

Green roofs improve and reduce energy consumption. They can reduce heating by adding mass and thermal resistance value, and can reduce the heat island effect by increasing evapotranspiration. A 2005 study by Brad Bass of the University of Toronto showed that green roofs can also reduce heat loss and energy consumption in winter conditions. A modeling study found that adding green roofs to 50 percent of the available surfaces in downtown Toronto would cool the entire city by 0.1 to 0.8 °C (0.2 to 1.4 °F).

Through evaporative cooling, a green roof reduces cooling loads on a building by fifty to ninety percent, especially if it is glassed-in to act as a terrarium and passive solar heat reservoir.

A concentration of green roofs in an urban area can reduce the city's average temperatures during the summer, combating the urban heat island effect. Traditional building materials soak up the sun's radiation and re-emit it as heat, making cities at least 4 °C (7.2 °F) hotter than surrounding areas. On Chicago's City Hall, by contrast, which features a green roof, roof temperatures on a hot day are typically 1.4–4.4 °C (2.5–7.9 °F) cooler than they are on traditionally roofed buildings nearby. Green roofs are becoming common in Chicago, as well as in Atlanta, Portland, and other United States cities, where their use is encouraged by regulations to combat the urban heat-island effect. Green roofs are a type of low impact development.

A 2023 meta-analysis found that green roofs reduce rooftop surface temperatures by an average of 30 °C during summer months, providing significant mitigation of urban heat island effects. A 2023 systematic review of 86 studies reported that extensive green roofs typically reduce roof surface temperatures by 15–30 °C during peak summer conditions, while also lowering indoor temperatures by 1–4 °C depending on substrate depth and regional climate.

A 2025 systematic review and meta-analysis found that green roofs reduced roof surface temperatures by an average of 10.88°C compared with bare concrete roofs and indoor temperatures by an average of 2.4°C compared with conventional roofs.

Researchers have found that there wasn't a statistically significant difference between green roofs and painted roofs when looking at roof surface temperatures and indoor temperatures.

In the case of Chicago, the city has passed codes offering incentives to builders who put green roofs on their buildings. The Chicago City Hall green roof is one of the earliest and most well-known examples of green roofs in the United States; it was planted as an experiment to determine the effects a green roof would have on the microclimate of the roof. Following this and other studies, it has now been estimated that if all the roofs in a major city were greened, urban temperatures could be reduced by as much as 7 °C (13 °F).

A 2025 simulation study of a bio-solar green roof in Cosenza, Italy, found that the cooling effect of the vegetation could increase solar panel electricity production by about 4% compared with panels on a conventional roof. The study also estimated a 30.8% reduction in green roof water consumption when solar panels covered 60% of the roof.

=== Water management ===
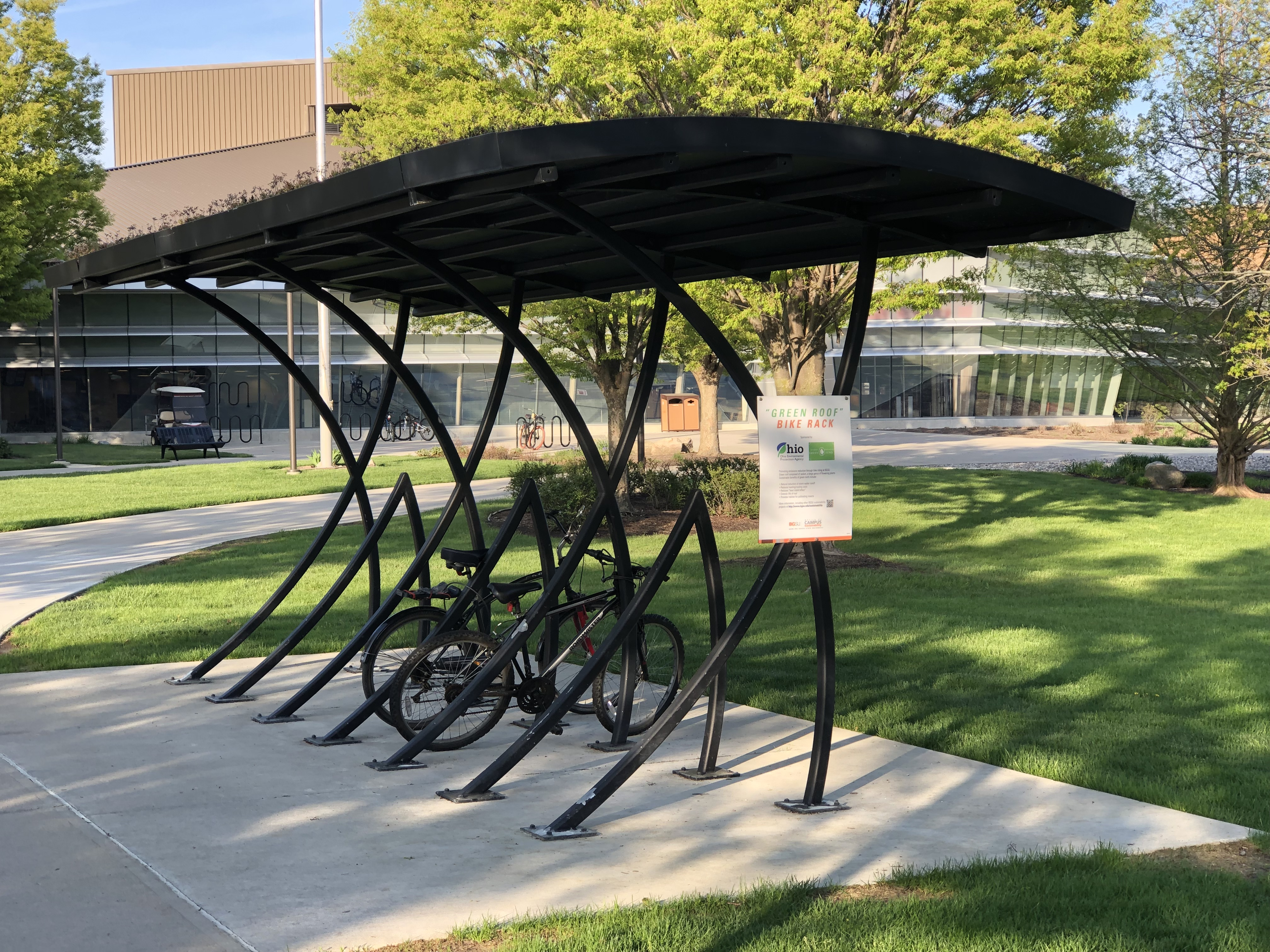
A green roof being used on a bike rack to keep bikes dry.

Green roofs can reduce stormwater runoff via water-wise gardening techniques. Green roofs play a significant role in retrofitting the low-impact development (LID) practices in urban areas. A study presented at the Green Roofs for Healthy Cities Conference in June 2004, cited by the EPA, found water runoff was reduced by over 75% during rainstorms. Water is stored by the roof's substrate and then taken up by the plants, from which it is returned to the atmosphere through transpiration and evaporation. A 2024 study of a 12-year-old green roof in Pittsburgh, Pennsylvania, analyzed seven years of monitoring data and found that the system reduced peak stormwater runoff rates by an average of 93% and delayed runoff by an average of 4.3 hours.

Green roofs decrease the total amount of runoff and slow the rate of runoff from the roof. It has been found that they can retain up to 75% of rainwater, gradually releasing it back into the atmosphere via condensation and transpiration, A 2025 field study of an extensive green roof in São Paulo, Brazil, found that it retained 73% of total rainfall over 41 rain events, with an average per-event retention of 82%, compared with about 57–62% reported in global reviews. Small storms were almost fully retained, while larger storms lowered retention. Many green roofs are installed to comply with local regulations and government fees, often regarding stormwater runoff management. In areas with combined sewer-stormwater systems, heavy storms can overload the wastewater system and cause it to flood, dumping raw sewage into the local waterways. Green roofs can also release nutrients into runoff. In a 2024 systematic review, there were mixed results for phosphorus and nitrogen retention, with some studies reporting a reduction in runoff concentrations and others reporting increases.

=== Ecological benefits ===
Green roofs create natural habitat as part of an urban wilderness. Even in high-rise urban settings as tall as 19 stories, it has been found that green roofs can attract beneficial insects, birds, bees and butterflies. A recent list of the bee species recorded from green roofs (worldwide) highlights both the diversity of species, but also the (expected) bias towards small ground-nesting species (Hofmann and Renner, 2017). Rooftop greenery complements wild areas by providing stepping stones for songbirds, migratory birds, and other wildlife facing shortages of natural habitat. Bats have also been reported to be more active over green roofs due to the foraging opportunities these roofs provide. Research at the Javits Center green roof in New York City, has shown a correlation between higher numbers of certain insects on the roof, particularly moths, with an increased amount of bat foraging activity. Research from 2023 in St. Louis, Missouri, showed that urban rooftop food gardens support diverse bee populations, enhancing urban pollination and biodiversity.

Green roofs also serve as a green wall, filtering pollutants and carbon dioxide out of the air, helping to lower rates of diseases such as asthma. They can also filter pollutants and heavy metals out of rainwater.

The outcome of a 2024 systematic review of 386 peer-reviewed studies shows that, in terms of both climatic and non-climatic benefits, intensive green roofs are superior to extensive green roofs. Nevertheless, many of the studies examined dealt with extensive green roofs only, most of which had a focus on simulation, modeling and theoretical research rather than real-world experimental findings.

=== Carbon sequestration ===
An additional environmental benefit of a green roof is the ability to sequester carbon. Carbon is the main component of plant matter and is naturally absorbed by plant tissue. The carbon is stored in the plant tissue and the soil substrate through plant litter and root exudates. A study on green roofs in Michigan and Maryland found the above-ground biomass and below ground substrate stored on average between 168 g C m^{−2} and 107 g C m^{−2} . Variations occurred among the different species of plant used. Substrate carbon content averaged 913 g C m^{−2} and after the subtraction of the original carbon content the total sequestration was 378 g C m^{−2}. The sequestration can be improved by changing plant species, increasing substrate depth, substrate composition, and management practices. In a study done in Michigan above ground sequestration ranged from 64 g C m^{−2} to 239 g C m^{−2} for S. acre and S album.

Also, by increasing the substrate depth would allow for more area of carbon storage and diversify the types of plants with greater potential of carbon storage. The direct carbon sequestration techniques and methods can be measured and accounted for. Green roofs also indirectly reduce CO_{2} given off by power plants through their ability to insulate buildings. Buildings in the US account for 38% of the total carbon dioxide emissions. A model supported by the US Department of Energy found a 2% reduction in electricity consumption and 9–11% reduction in natural gas when implementing green roofs. Through this, a 2023 comprehensive review highlighted that green roofs also contribute to carbon dioxide reduction through both direct sequestration and indirect mechanisms, such as decreasing building energy consumption and mitigating urban heat islands.

=== Other ===
- Help to insulate a building for sound; the soil helps to block lower frequencies and the plants block higher frequencies
- If installed correctly many living roofs can contribute to LEED points
- Increase agricultural space
- Green roofs not only retain rainwater, but also moderate the temperature of the water and act as natural filters for any of the water that happens to run off.

== Costs and financial benefits ==
Roof garden: a roof that uses garden boxes, which can be a more economical solution for a green roof.

A properly designed and installed extensive green-roof system can cost $108–$248/m^{2} ($10–$23/ft^{2}) while an intensive green roof costs $355–$2,368/m^{2} ($33–$220/ft^{2}) However, since most of the materials used to build the green roof can be salvaged, it is estimated that the cost of replacing a green roof is generally one third of the initial installation costs.

With the initial cost of installing a green roof in mind, there are many financial benefits that accompany green roofing.

- Green roofing can extend the lifespan of a roof by over 200% by covering the waterproofing membrane with growing medium and vegetation, this shields the membrane from ultra-violet radiation and physical damage. Further, Penn State University's Green Roof Research Center expects the lifespan of a roof to increase by as much as three times after greening the roof.
- It is estimated that the installation of a green roof could increase the real estate value of an average house by about 7%.
- Reduction in energy use is an important property of green roofing. By improving the thermal performance of a roof, green roofing allows buildings to better retain their heat during the cooler winter months while reflecting and absorbing solar radiation during the hotter summer months, allowing buildings to remain cooler. A study conducted by Environment Canada found a 26% reduction in summer cooling needs and a 26% reduction in winter heat losses when a green roof is used. With respect to hotter summer weather, green roofing is able to reduce the solar heating of a building by reflecting 27% of solar radiation, absorbing 60% by the vegetation through photosynthesis and evapotranspiration, and absorbing the remaining 13% into the growing medium. Such mitigation of solar radiation has been found to reduce building temperatures by up to 20 °C (36 °F) and reduce energy needs for air-conditioning by 25–80%. This reduction in energy required to cool a building in the summer is accompanied by a reduction in energy required to heat a building in the winter, thus reducing the energy requirements of the building year-round which allows the building temperature to be controlled at a lower cost.
- Depending on the region in which a green roof is installed, incentives may be available in the form of stormwater tax reduction, grants, or rebates. The regions where these incentives will most likely be found are areas where failing storm water management infrastructure is in place, urban heat island effect has significantly increased the local air temperature, or areas where environmental contaminants in the storm water runoff is of great concern. An example of such an incentive is a one-year property tax credit is available in New York City, since 2009, for property owners who green at least 50% of their roof area.

== Disadvantages ==
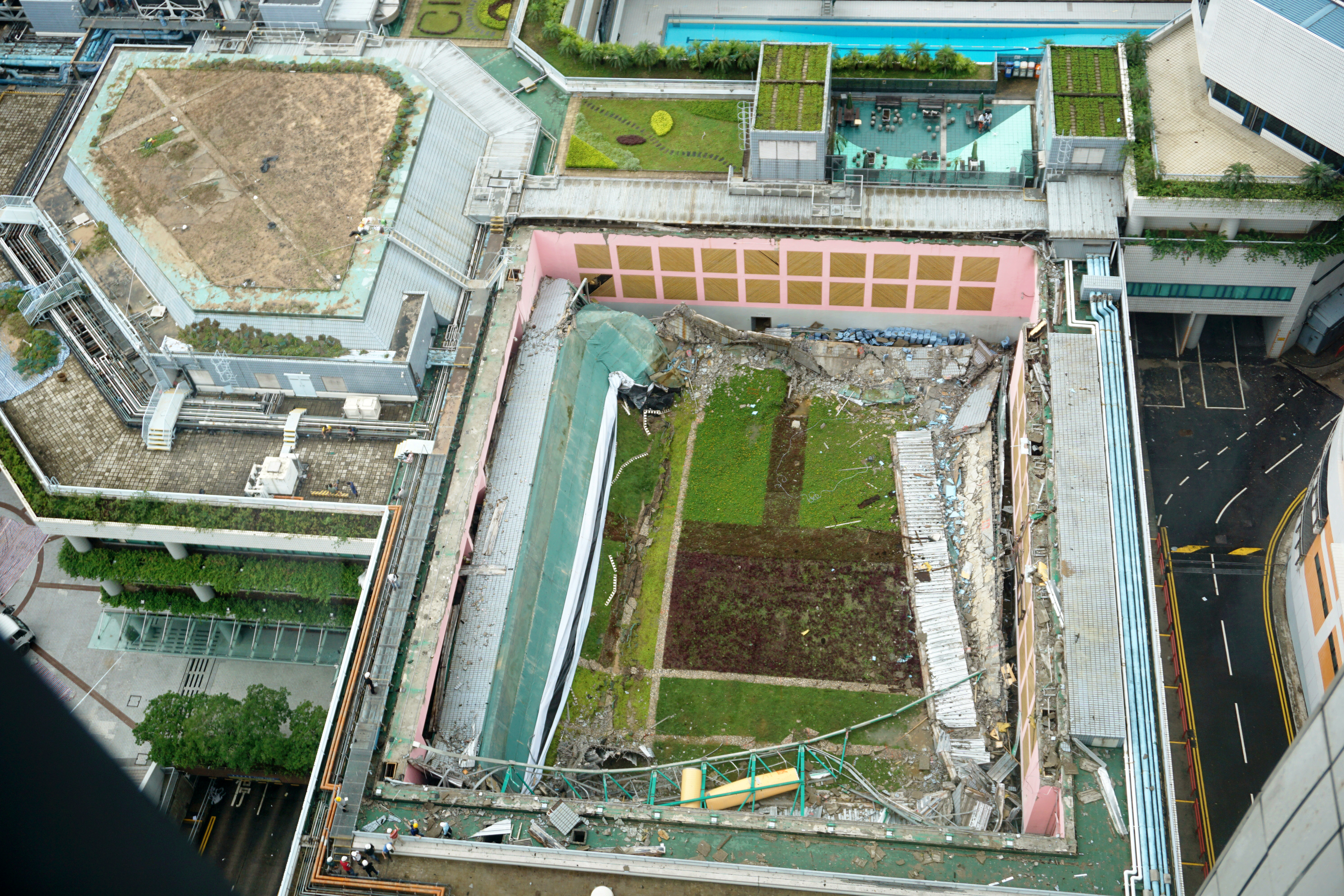
The addition of a green roof to an existing structure led to this collapse at the City University of Hong Kong.

The main disadvantage of green roofs is that the initial cost of installing a green roof can be double that of a normal roof. Depending on what kind of green roof it is, the maintenance costs could be higher, but some types of green roof have little or no ongoing cost. Some kinds of green roofs also place higher demands on the waterproofing system of the structure, both because water is retained on the roof and due to the possibility of roots penetrating the waterproof membrane. Another disadvantage is that the wildlife they attract may include pest insects which could easily infiltrate a residential building through open windows.

The additional mass of the soil substrate and retained water places a large strain on the structural support of a building. This makes it unlikely for intensive green roofs to become widely implemented due to a lack of buildings that are able to support such a large amount of added weight as well as the added cost of reinforcing buildings to be able to support such weight. Some types of green roofs do have more demanding structural standards especially in seismic regions of the world. Some existing buildings cannot be retrofitted with certain kinds of green roofs because of the weight load of the substrate and vegetation exceeds permitted static loading. The weight of a green roof caused the collapse of a large sports hall roof in Hong Kong in 2016. In the wake of the disaster, numerous other green roofs around the territory were removed.

Green roofs require significantly more maintenance and maintenance energy compared to a standard roof. Standard maintenance includes removing debris, controlling weeds, deadheading, trimming, checking moisture levels, and fertilizing. The maintenance energy use for green roofs has many variables, including: climate, intensity of rainfall, type of building, type of vegetation, and external coatings. The most significant effect comes from scarce rainfall which will increase the maintenance energy due to the watering required. During a 10-year roof maintenance cycle a house with a green roof requires more retrofit embodied energy than a house with a white roof. The individual components of a green roof have CO_{2} implications during the manufacturing process that are additional implications compared to a conventional roof. The embodied energy for green roof components are 23.6 kg/m^{2} (5 pounds per square foot) CO_{2} of green roof. This value is equivalent to 6448 g C m^{−2} which is significantly greater than 378 g C m^{−2.} Criteria for waste management practices when green roofs reach their end-of-life remain uncodified.

Both sod roofs and LWA-based (Lightweight Aggregates) roofs have been found to have a negative impact on the quality of their resulting runoff.

== Types ==
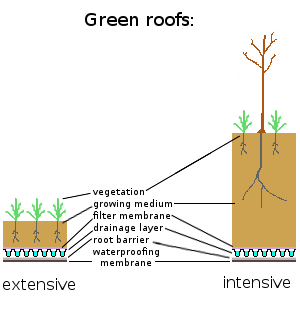
An intensive and an extensive green roof

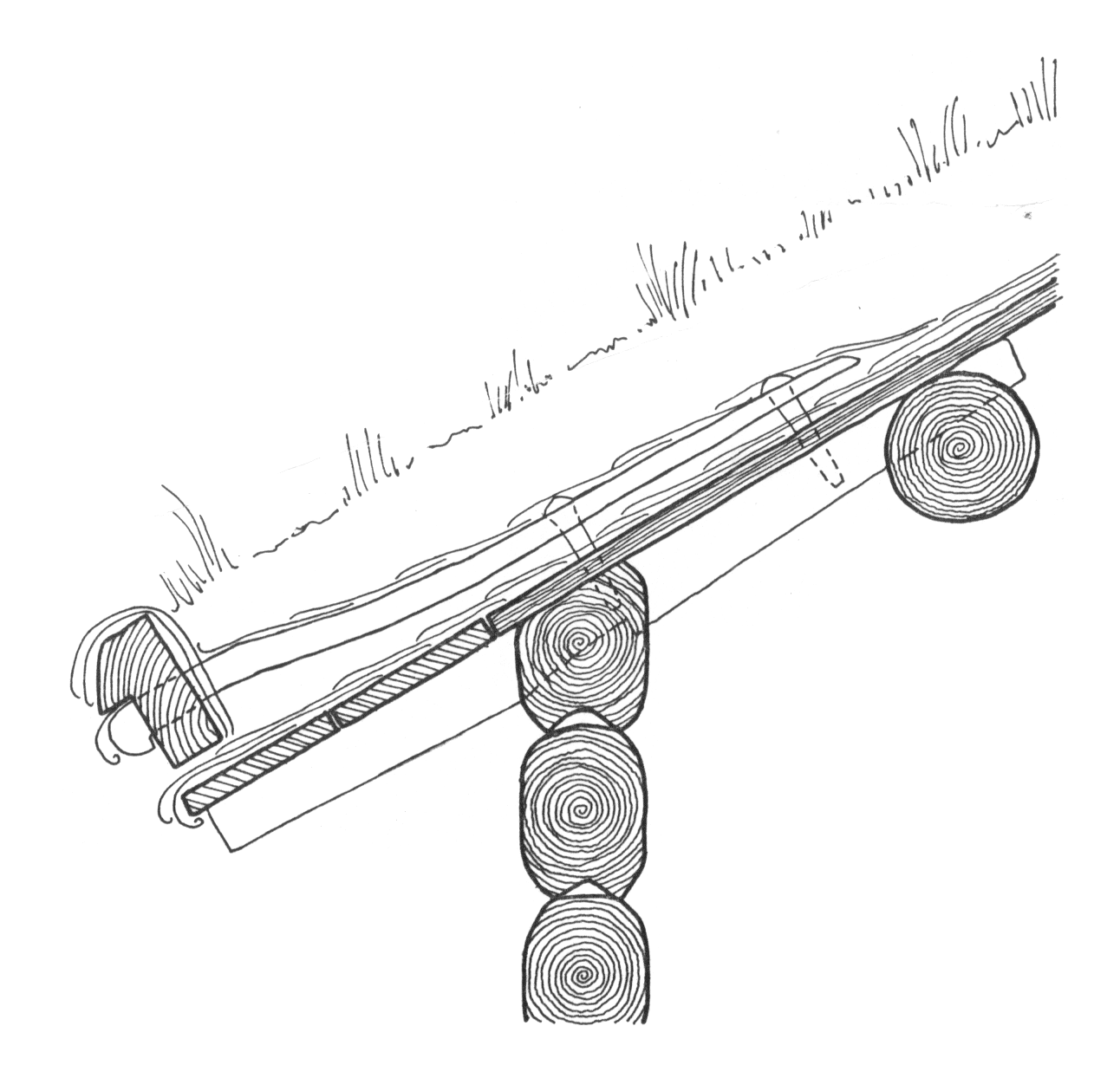
Section of a Gudbrandsdal type sod roof with elaborate "turf log".

Green roofs can be categorized as intensive, semi-intensive, or extensive, depending on the depth of the planting medium and the amount of maintenance they need. Extensive green roofs traditionally support 50–120 kg/m^{2} (10–25 pounds per square foot) of vegetation while intensive roofs support 390–730 kg/m^{2} (80–150 pounds per square foot) of vegetation. Traditional roof gardens, which require a reasonable depth of soil to grow large plants or conventional lawns, are considered intensive because they are labour-intensive, requiring irrigation, feeding, and other maintenance. Intensive roofs are more park-like with easy access and may include anything from kitchen herbs to shrubs and small trees.

Extensive green roofs, by contrast, are designed to be virtually self-sustaining and should require only a minimum of maintenance, perhaps a once-yearly weeding or an application of slow-release fertilizer to boost growth. Extensive roofs are usually only accessed for maintenance. They can be established on a very thin layer of soil (most use specially formulated composts): even a thin layer of rockwool laid directly onto a watertight roof can support a planting of Sedum species and mosses. Some green roof designs incorporate both intensive and extensive elements. To protect the roof, a waterproofing membrane is often used, which is manufactured to remain watertight in extreme conditions including constant dampness, ponding water, high and low alkaline conditions and exposure to plant roots, fungi and bacterial organisms.

Advances in green roof technology have led to the development of new systems that do not fit into the traditional classification of green roof types. Comprehensive green roofs bring the most advantageous qualities of extensive and intensive green roofs together. Comprehensive green roofs support plant varieties typically seen in intensive green roofs at the depth and weight of an extensive green roof system.

Another important distinction is between pitched green roofs and flat green roofs. Pitched sod roofs, a traditional feature of many Scandinavian buildings, tend to be of a simpler design than flat green roofs. This is because the pitch of the roof reduces the risk of water penetrating through the roof structure, allowing the use of fewer waterproofing and drainage layers.

== History ==
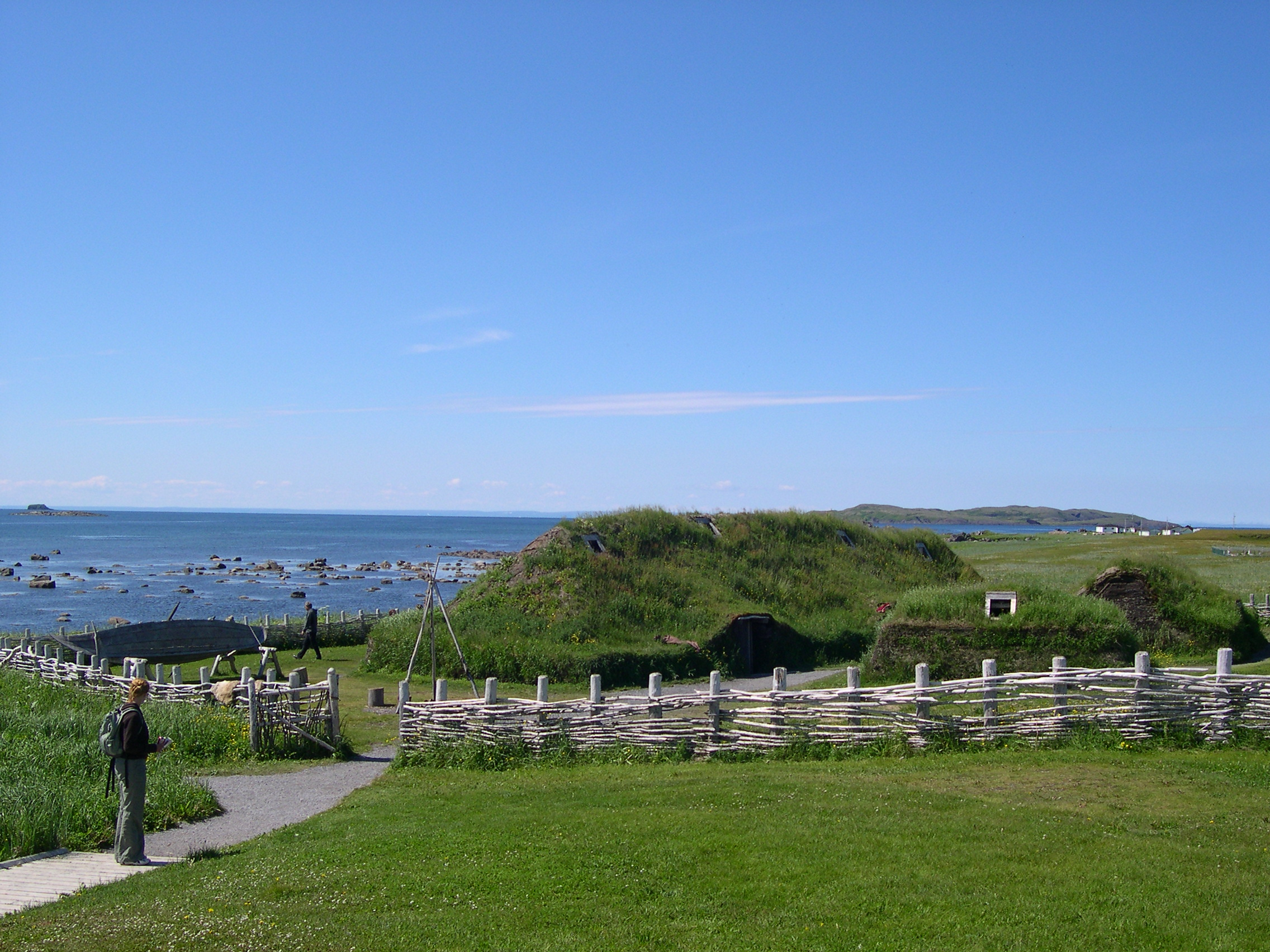
Re-creation of Viking houses in Newfoundland.

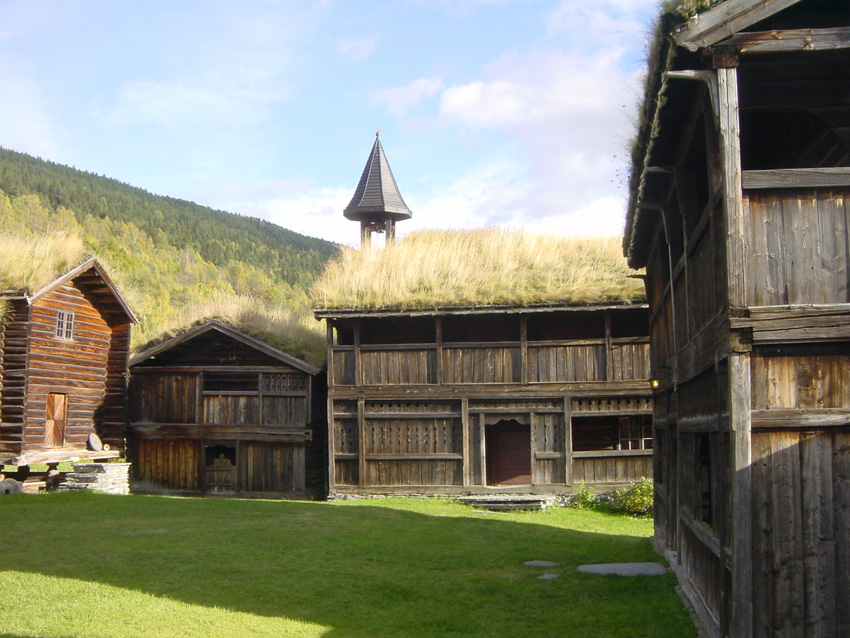
Sod roofs on 18th-century farm buildings in Heidal, Norway.

In ancient times green roofs consisted of cave-like structures or sod roofs covered with earth and plants commonly used for agriculture, dwelling, and ceremonial purposes. These early shelters provided protection from the elements, good insulation during the winter months, and a cool location in the summer. Unfortunately for modern conveniences, these were neither waterproof nor was there any system to keep out unwanted burrowing wildlife.

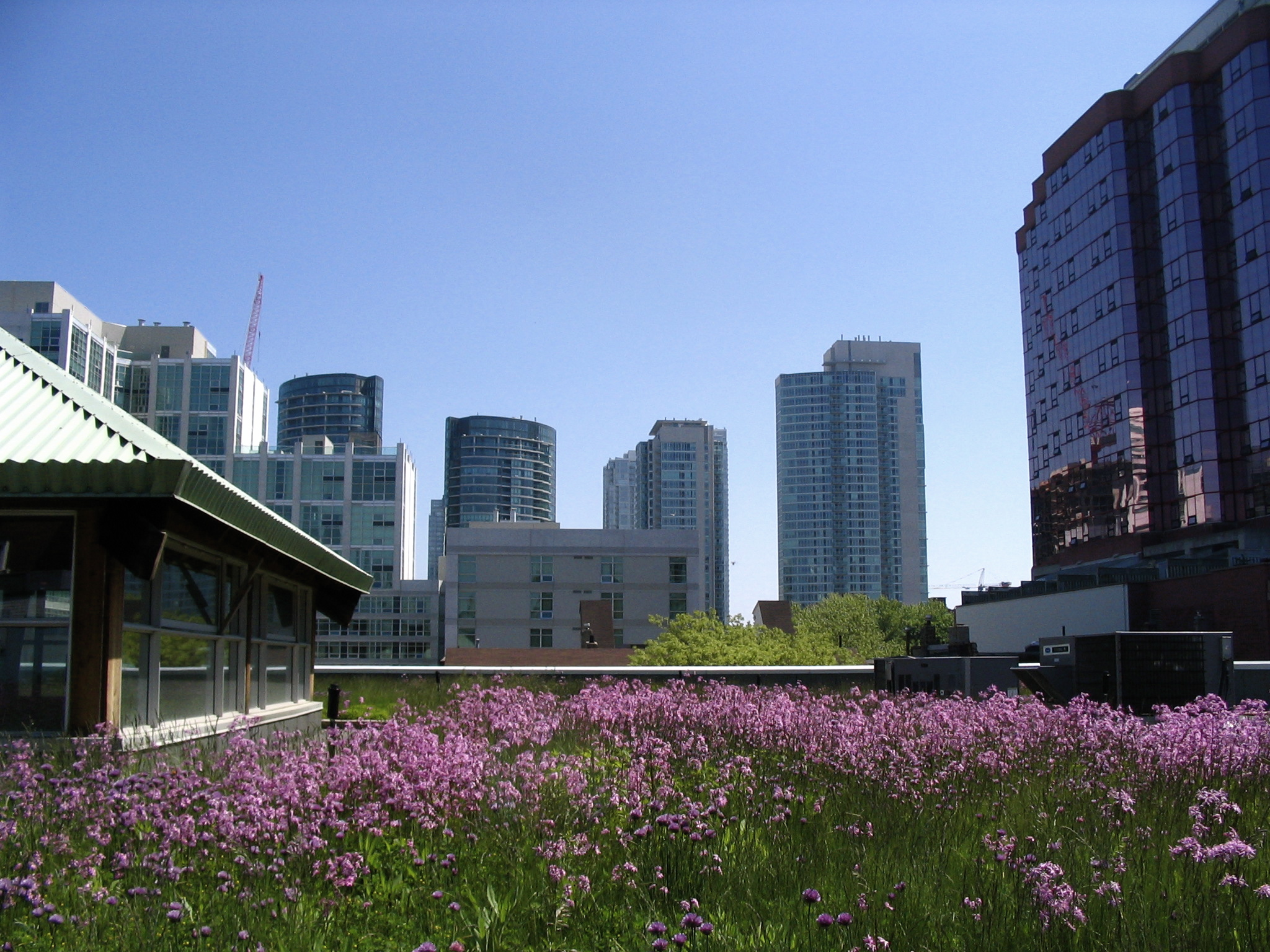
On the green roof of the Mountain Equipment Co-op store in Toronto, Ontario, Canada.

Modern green roofs, which are made of a system of manufactured layers deliberately placed over roofs to support growing medium and vegetation, are a relatively new phenomenon. However, green roofs or sod roofs in northern Scandinavia have been around for centuries. The modern trend started when green roofs were developed in Germany in the 1960s, and has since spread to many countries. Today, it is estimated that about 10% of all German roofs have been "greened".

A number of European Countries have very active associations promoting green roofs, including Germany, Switzerland, the Netherlands, Norway, Italy, Austria, Hungary, Sweden, the UK, and Greece. Germany was the first country to start developing green roof systems and market them on a large scale. The City of Linz in Austria has been paying developers to install green roofs since 1983, and in Switzerland, the city of Basel has used subsidies and building regulations since the 1990s to require or encourage green roofs on new and renovated buildings, with about 40% of its flat roofs now greened. In the UK, their uptake has been slow, but a number of cities have developed policies to encourage their use, notably London and Sheffield.

Green roofs are also becoming increasingly popular in North America, although they are not as common as in some parts of Europe. Numerous North American cities offer tax incentives to developers who integrate green roofs in their buildings. Toronto and San Francisco legally mandate new buildings to include green roofs.

Rooftop water purification is also being implemented in green roofs. These forms of green roofs are actually treatment ponds built into the rooftops. They are built either from a simple substrate or with plant-based ponds. Plants used include Calamus, Menyanthes trifoliata, Mentha aquatica, etc.)

Several studies have been carried out in Germany since the 1970s. Berlin is one of the most important centers of green roof research in Germany. Particularly in the last 10 years, much more research has begun. About ten green roof research centers exist in the US and activities exist in about 40 countries. In a recent study on the impacts of green infrastructure, in particular green roofs in the Greater Manchester area, researchers found that adding green roofs can help keep temperatures down, particularly in urban areas: "adding green roofs to all buildings can have a dramatic effect on maximum surface temperatures, keeping temperatures below the 1961–1990 current form case for all time periods and emissions scenarios. Roof greening makes the biggest difference…where the building proportion is high and the evaporative fraction is low. Thus, the largest difference was made in the town centers".

== Brown roofs ==
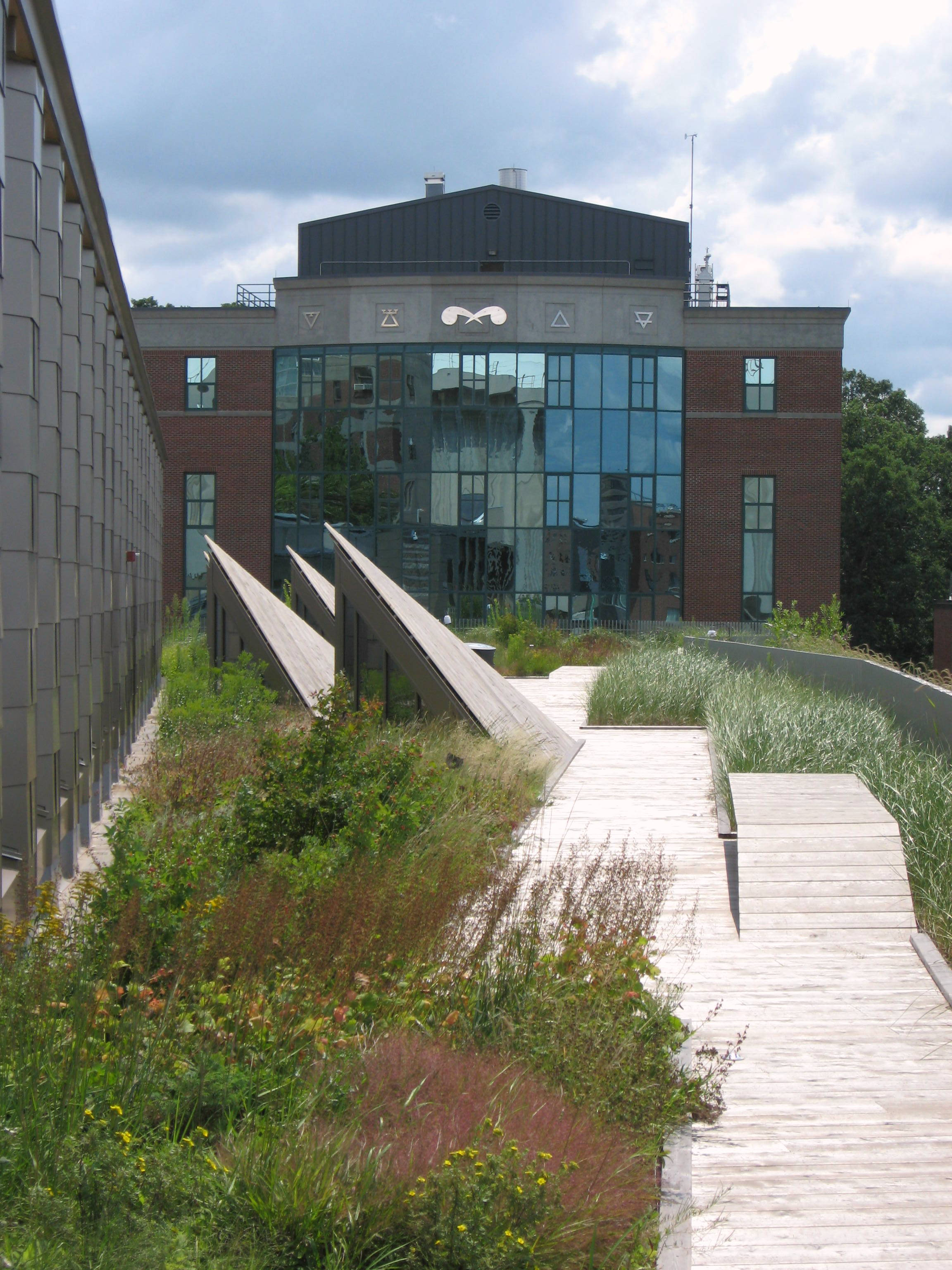
Roof planted with dune plants from the shores of Lake Ontario, SUNY-ESF, Syracuse, New York.

Industrial brownfield sites can be valuable ecosystems, supporting rare species of plants, animals and invertebrates. Increasingly in demand for redevelopment, these habitats are under threat. "Brown roofs", also known as "biodiverse roofs", can partly mitigate this loss of habitat by covering the flat roofs of new developments with a layer of locally sourced material. Construction techniques for brown roofs are typically similar to those used to create flat green roofs, the main difference being the choice of growing medium (usually locally sourced rubble, gravel, soil, etc.) to meet a specific biodiversity objective. In Switzerland, it is common to use alluvial gravels from the foundations; in London, a mix of brick rubble and some concrete has been used.

The original idea was to allow the roofs to self-colonise with plants, but they are sometimes seeded to increase their biodiversity potential in the short term. Such practices are derided by purists. The roofs are colonised by spiders and insects (many of which are becoming extremely rare in the UK as such sites are developed) and provide a feeding site for insectivorous birds. Laban, a centre for contemporary dance in London, has a brown roof specifically designed to encourage the nationally rare black redstart. A green roof, 160 m (520 ft) above ground level, and claimed to be the highest in the UK and Europe "and probably in the world" to act as nature reserve, is on the Barclays Bank HQ in Canary Wharf. Designed combining the principles of green and brown roofs, it is already home to a range of rare invertebrates.

== Blue-Green Roofs ==
Blue roofs operate as stormwater management systems, storing stormwater, whether in an open water surface or beneath shingles, and controlling the rate at which it is released. A blue-green roof combines blue roof technology with that of a green roof to optimize the benefits of greening roof scapes, storing water beneath layers of substrate and vegetation. Benefits include mitigating stormwater runoff impacts, reusing stormwater for irrigation of the green roof, and cooling indoor temperatures of buildings. Both extensive and intensive roofs can support a blue-green roof through a variety of approaches such as rooftop gardens, smart blue-green roofs (focused on urban cooling), and podium green decks.

Blue-green roofs are optimal for energy-saving cooling in buildings because the water crate layer maintains stable temperatures. This is beneficial throughout the year with research showing that locations with blue-green roofs are less sensitive to air temperature fluctuation in the winter and summer than locations with conventional roofs. Another advantage of blue-green roofs over green roofs and conventional roofs is they have higher evaporation rates which create lower surface temperatures and mitigate the urban heat island effect.

== ASLA Award Green Roof Projects ==
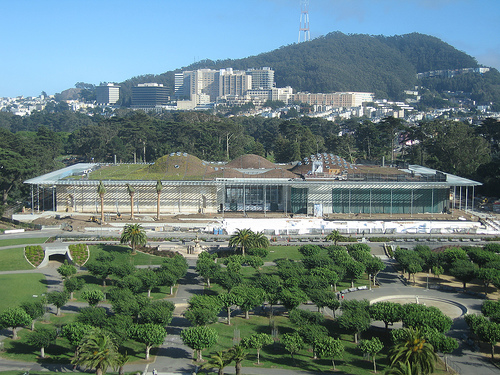
The new California Academy of Sciences building in San Francisco's Golden Gate Park has a green roof that provides 2.5 acres (10,000 m^{2}) of native vegetation designed as a habitat for indigenous species, including the threatened Bay checkerspot butterfly. According to the Academy's fact sheet on the building, the building consumes 30–35% less energy than required by code.

- 2017 Award: Seeding Green Roofs for Greater Biodiversity and Lower Costs, Lincoln, NE, US. Richard Sutton
- 2013 Award: Green Roof Innovation Testing Laboratory, Toronto, Ontario, Canada. John H. Daniels, Brooklyn Botanic Garden Visitors Center, Brooklyn. HMWhite, and NYC Parks Green Roof: A Living Laboratory for Innovative Green Roof Design, New York, NY. NYC Parks
- 2012 Award: Lafayette Greens: Urban Agriculture, Urban Fabric, Urban Sustainability, Detroit. Kenneth Weikal Landscape Architecture 200 Fifth Avenue, NYC. Landworks Studio, Inc.
- 2011 Award: Manassas Park Elementary School Landscape, Manassas Park, VA. Siteworks]
- 2009 Award: California Academy of Sciences, San Francisco, CA. SWA Group, Changi Airport Terminal 3 Interior Landscape, Singapore. Tierra Design (S) Pte Ltd, Corporate Headquarters, San Francisco, CA. OLIN, Macallen Building, South Boston, MA. Landworks Studio, Inc., and Museo del Acero Horno3, Monterrey, Mexico. Surfacedesign Inc.+ Harari arquitectos
- 2008 Award: Gannett/USA Today Headquarters, McLean, Virginia. Michael Vergason Landscape Architects, Ltd.
- 2007 Award: Washington Mutual Center Roof Garden, Seattle, Washington. Phillips Farevaag Smallenberg
- 2002 Award: Chicago City Hall Green Roof, Chicago, Illinois. David Yocca

== Examples by country ==
=== Australia ===
Green roofs have been increasing in popularity in Australia over the past 10 years. Some of the early examples include the Freshwater Place residential tower in Melbourne (2002) with its Level 10 rooftop Half Acre Garden, CH2 building housing the Melbourne City Council (2006) – Australia's first 6-star Green Star Design commercial office building as certified by the Green Building Council of Australia, and Condor Tower (2005) with a 75-square-metre (810-square-foot) lawn on the 4th floor.

Since 2008, city councils and influential business groups in Australia have become active promoting the benefits of green roofs. "The Blueprint to Green Roof Melbourne" is one program being run by the Committee for Melbourne. In 2010, the largest Australian green roof project was announced. The Victorian Desalination Project will have a "living tapestry" of 98,000 Australian indigenous plants over a roof area spanning more than 26,000 m^{2} (280,000 square feet). The roof will form part of the desalination plant's sophisticated roof system, designed to blend the building into the landscape, and provide acoustic protection, corrosion resistance, thermal control, and reduced maintenance.

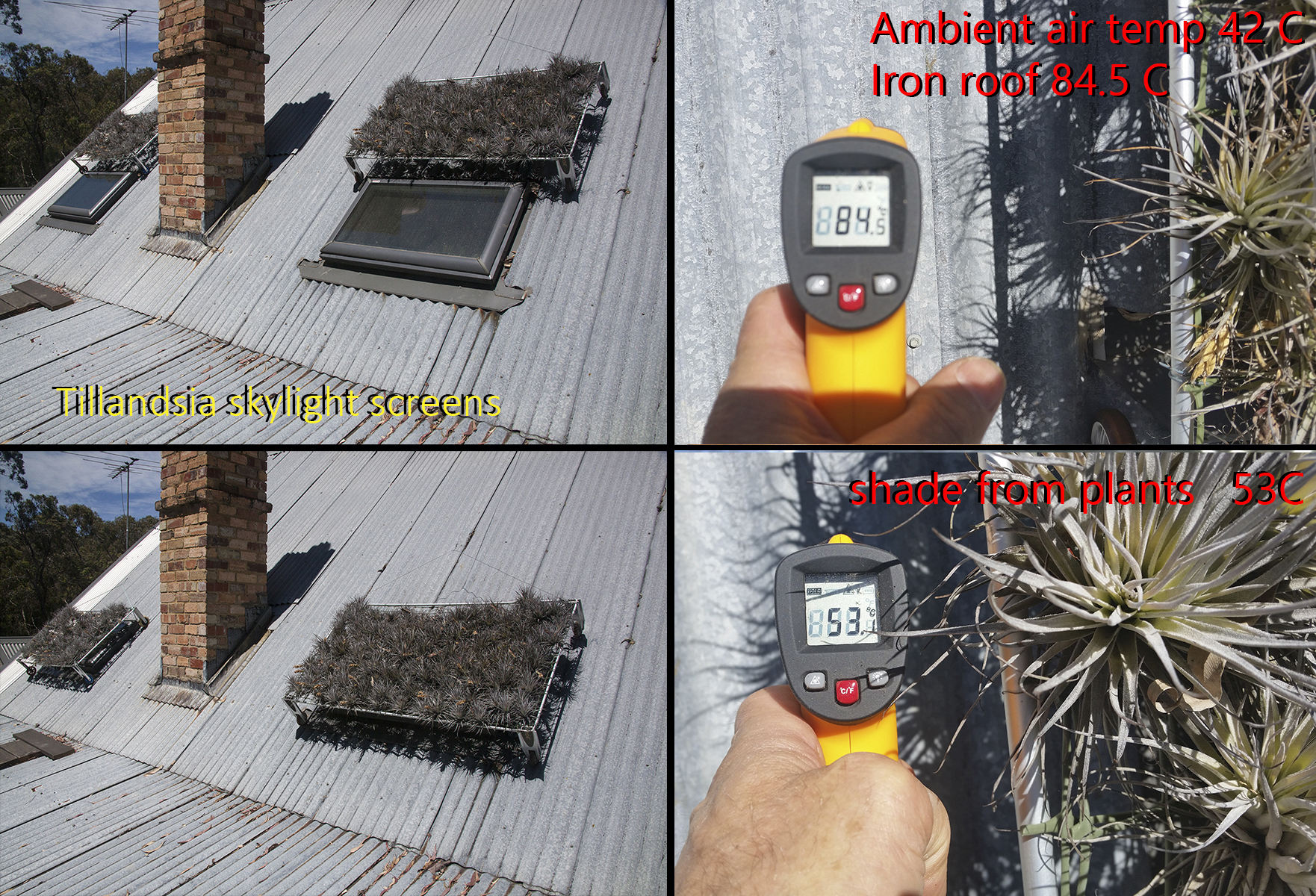
Movable Tillandsia plant screen.

In June 2014 ecological artist Lloyd Godman, with structural engineer Stuart Jones and environmental scientist Grant Harris, collaborated to install an experiment using Tillandsia plants in extreme outdoor conditions at levels 92, 91, 65 and 56 on Eureka Tower in Melbourne, Australia. The selected air plants are extremely light, and are able to grow with no soil or watering system, and the plants have been checked at regular intervals since their installation and are still growing and flowering. One species, Tillandsia bergeri, has grown from a single shoot to several thriving colonies.

The project is now titled Tillandsia SWARM and has been expanded to include many other buildings across Australia, including Federation Square, National Gallery of Victoria and Essendon Airport. Godman has also experimented with Tillandsia plant screens that can be moved across skylights to create shade in summer and to allow in sun during winter. Temperature readings taken on a 40 °C (104 °F) day in summer revealed that the surface temperature on the roof had reached 84 °C (183 °F), while the shadows cast by the plants had reduced the surface temperature on the roof to 51 °C (124 °F).

=== Canada ===
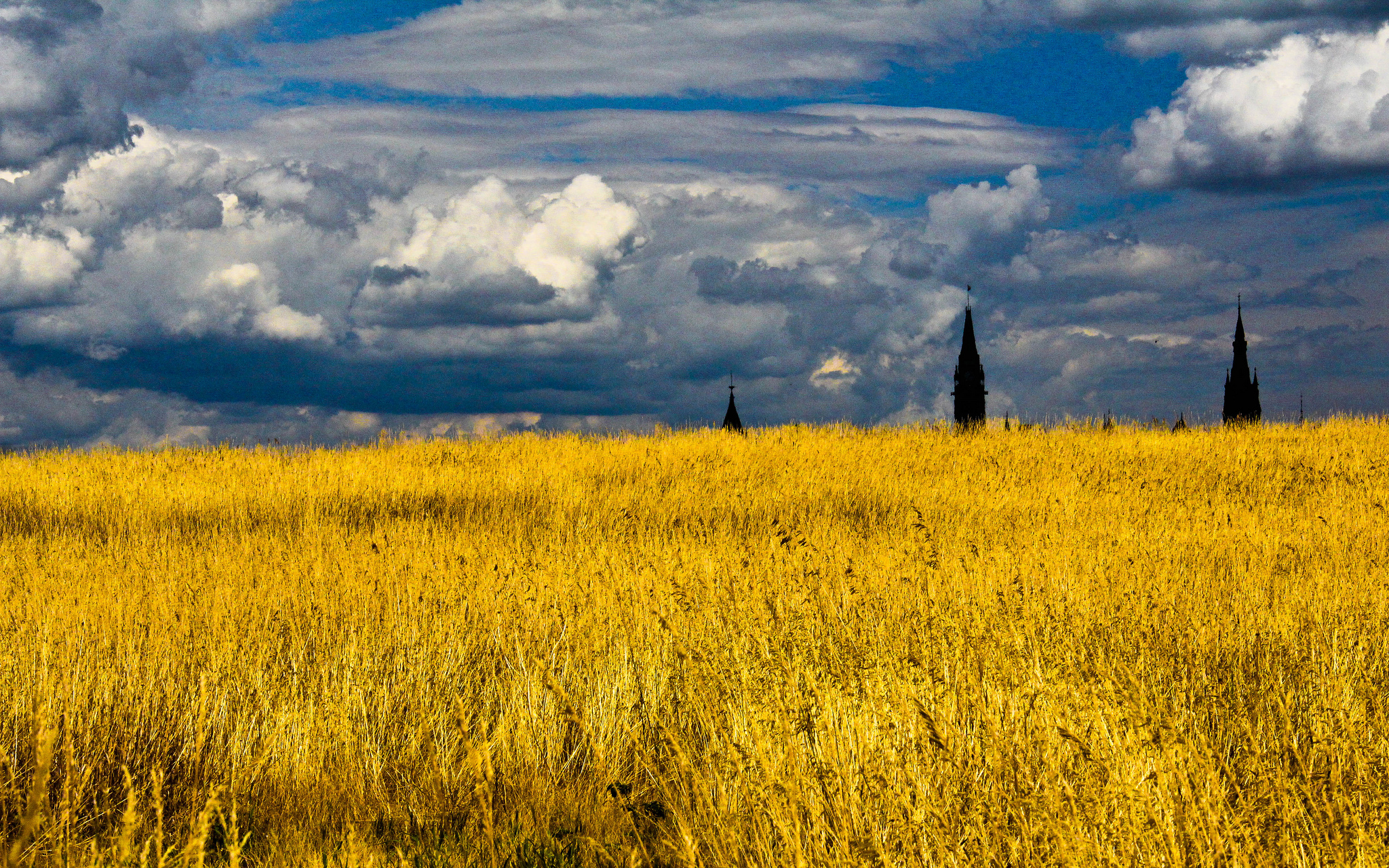
The green roof on top of the Canadian War Museum in Ottawa looks like a wheatfield, with the towers of Canada's Parliament visible in the distance.

The city of Toronto approved a by-law in May 2009 mandating green roofs on residential and industrial buildings. There is criticism from Green Roofs for Healthy Cities that the new laws are not stringent enough, since they will only apply to residential building that are a minimum of six stories high. By 31 January 2011, industrial buildings were required to render 10% or 2,000 m^{2} (22,000 sq ft) of their roofs green. Toronto City Hall's Podium roof was renovated to include a 3,000 m^{2} (32,000 square feet) rooftop garden, the largest publicly accessible roof in the city. The green roof was opened to the public in June 2010. Many green roofs in Canada also use sustainable rainwater harvesting practices.

In 2008, the Vancouver Convention Centre installed a 2.4-hectare (6-acre) living roof of indigenous plants and grasses on its West building, making it the largest green roof in Canada. The new Canadian War Museum in Ottawa, opened in 2005, also features a grass-covered roof.

During the renovation of the Hamilton City Hall in Hamilton, Ontario, that spanned from 2007 to 2010, many efforts were taken to enhance the environmentally friendly nature of the structure, which included the addition of a grass-covered roof.

Simon Fraser University's Burnaby campus contains a substantial number of green roofs.

Canada's first LEED Platinum V4 Home in Wakefield QC, EcoHome's Edelweiss House, has a living Green Roof which is sloped at 12 degrees.

=== Costa Rica ===
Living green roofs have been built and grown at Saint Michael's Sustainable Community since 2012. Native plants, mostly flowers chosen for the environment, maximum shade and mass provide a colorful and functional living roof. The community has the largest number of green roofs in the country.

=== Egypt ===
In Egypt, soil-less agriculture is used to grow plants on the roofs of buildings. No soil is placed directly on the roof itself, thus eliminating the need for an insulating layer; instead, plants are grown on wooden tables. Vegetables and fruit are the most popular candidates, providing a fresh, healthy source of food that is free from pesticides.

A more advanced method, aquaponics, being used experimentally in Egypt, is farming fish next to plants in a closed cycle. This allows the plants to benefit from the ammonia excreted by the fish, helping the plants to grow better and at the same time eliminating the need for changing the water for the fish, because the plants help to keep it clean by absorbing the ammonia. The fish also get some nutrients from the roots of the plants.

=== Finland ===
In Finland, green roofs are still scarce. Some experimental green roofs have been built in big cities. However, the capital city of Helsinki has published guidelines for enhancing the building of green roofs in the city. There is ongoing research on the topic as the conditions in southern Europe are very different from those in the north and knowledge acquired there cannot be directly applied to colder climates. The fifth dimension – Green roofs and walls in urban areas -research program aims to produce high-level scientific and broadly applicable knowledge on optimal green roof and wall solutions in Finland.

=== France ===
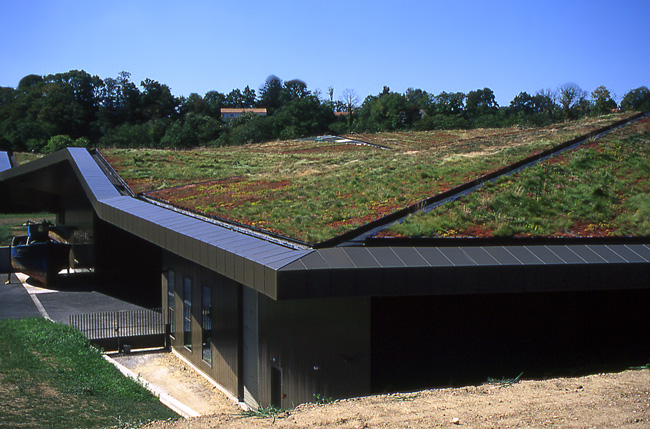
Green roof planted with native species at L'Historial de la Vendée, a new museum in western France.

In France, an 8,000 m^{2} (86,000 square feet) extensive, cable-supported green roof has been created on the International School in Lyon. Another huge green roof of roughly 8,000 m^{2} (86,000 square feet) has been incorporated into the new museum L'Historial de la Vendée which opened in June 2006 at Les Lucs-sur-Boulogne.

=== Germany ===
Long-held green roof traditions started in the early industrialization period more than 100 years ago exist in Germany. In the 1970s, green roof technology was elevated to the next level. Serious storm-water issues made cities think about innovative solutions, preferably with living plants. Modern green roof technology with high performance, lightweight materials were used to grow hardy vegetation even on roofs that can hardly support any additional load. In the 1980s modern green roof technology was common knowledge in Germany while it was practically unknown in any other country in the world. In Stuttgart, with one of the most innovative Department of Parks and Recreation and with the world's oldest horticultural Universities, modern green roof technology was perfected and implemented on a large scale. By the early 2000s, Germany had laws mandating that many metropolitan areas have green roofs.

With the first green roof industry boom in Germany there were quality issues recorded. The FLL formed a committee that is focused on modern green roof technology. FLL stands for Forschungsgesellschaft Landschaftsentwicklung Landschaftsbau e.V. (German Landscape Research, Development and Construction Society). The FLL is an independent non-profit organization. It was founded in 1975 by eight professional organizations for "the improvement of environmental conditions through the advancement and dissemination of plant research and its planned applications". The FLL green roof working group is only one of 40 committees which have published a long list of guidelines and labor instructions. Some of these guidelines also available in English including the German FLL-Guideline for the Planning, Execution and Upkeep of Green-Roof Sites. The results of the research and synthesis done by FLL members are constantly updated and promulgated utilizing the same principles which govern the compilation of DIN standards and are published as either guiding principles or labor instructions.

The current Green Roof Guideline was published in 2011. Today most elements of the German FLL are part of standards and guidelines around the world (FM Global, ASTM, NRCA, SPRI etc.).

Fachvereinigung Bauwerksbegrünung (FBB) was founded in 1990 as the second green roof association after DDV (Deutscher Dachgaertner Verband) in 1985. FBB was founded as an open forum for manufacturers and planners, merchants and operators in 1990. The organization was born from the then-visionary idea of understanding the relationship between nature and constructions not as oppositional, but as an opportunity. Both the green roofing and conventional roofing industries are equally represented.

The FBB has developed to become an innovative lobbying group with a strong market presence, internationally known through its cooperation with other European associations. Today, approximately 100 member companies use the multifaceted services offered by FBB, which offers a greater degree of market expertise and competitiveness. "Kompetenz im Markt".

Today, about 10,000,000 m^{2} (110,000,000 sq ft) of new green roofs are being constructed each year. According latest studies about 3/4 of these are extensive; the last 1/4 are roof gardens. The cities with the most green roofs in Germany are Berlin and Stuttgart. Surveys about the status of regulation are done by the FBB. Nearly one third of all German cities have regulations to support green-roof and rain-water technology. Green-roof research institutions are located in several cities as including Hannover, Berlin, Geisenheim and Neubrandenburg.

Germany is the country with the most green roofs in the world as well as the country with the most advanced knowledge in modern green roof technology. Green roofs in Germany are part of the 2–3 years apprentice educations system of landscaping professionals.

=== Greece ===
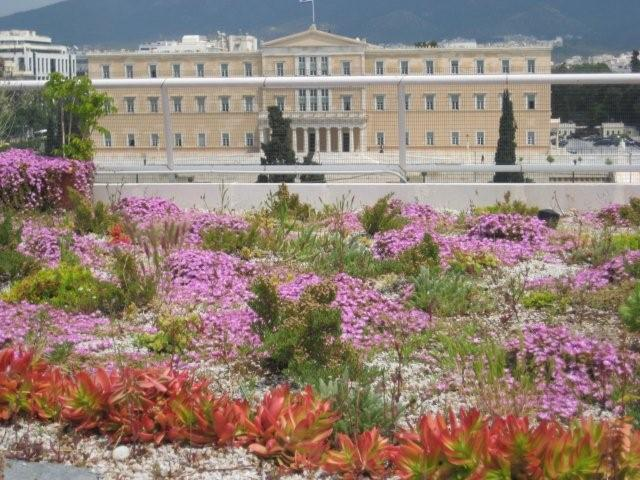
The oikostegi, a green roof on the Treasury building in Athens.

The Greek Ministry of Finance has now installed a green roof on the Treasury in Constitution Square in Athens. The so-called "oikostegi" (Greek – oiko, pronounced [ˈiko], meaning building-ecological, and stegi, pronounced staygee, meaning roof-abode-shelter) was inaugurated in September 2008. Studies of the thermodynamics of the roof in September 2008 concluded that the thermal performance of the building was significantly affected by the installation. In further studies, in August 2009, energy savings of 50% were observed for air conditioning in the floor directly below the installation. The ten-floor building has a total floor space of 1.4 hectares (3.5 acres). The oikostegi covers 650 sq ft (60 square metres), equalling 52% of the roof space and 8% of the total floor space. Despite this, energy savings totalling €5,630 per annum were recorded, which translates to a 9% saving in air conditioning and a 4% saving in heating bills for the whole building.

An additional observation and conclusion of the study was that the thermodynamic performance of the oikostegi had improved as biomass was added over the 12 months between the first and second study. This suggests that further improvements will be observed as the biomass increases still further. The study also stated that while measurements were being made by thermal cameras, a plethora of beneficial insects were observed on the roof, such as butterflies, honey bees and ladybirds. Obviously this was not the case before installation. Finally, the study suggested that both the micro-climate and biodiversity of Constitution Square, in Athens, Greece had been improved by the oikostegi.

=== Iceland ===
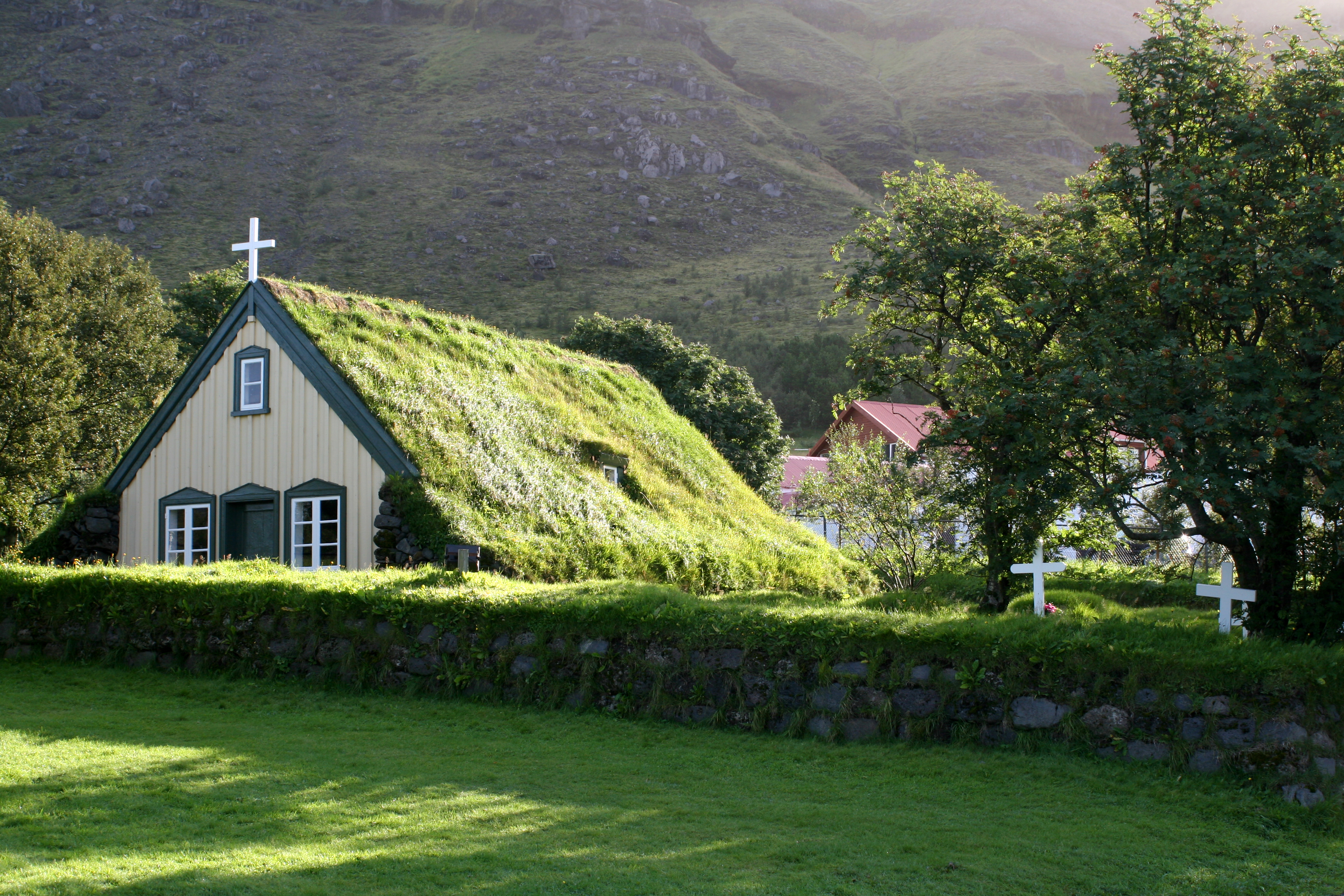
Sod roof Church at Hof, Iceland.

Sod roofs are frequently found on traditional farmhouses and farm buildings in Iceland.

=== India ===
Green roofs called Burze Pash were traditionally used in Kashmiri houses to provide insulation during winters. The rooftops were made from locally sourced birch wood, and covered with a fertile layer of soil, on which different flowers and even crops would be grown. The variety of flowers and crops frequently varied by region, creating diversity.

=== Malaysia ===
Bus stops in Kuala Lumpur were fitted with green roofs in 2019.

=== Norway ===
With sod roofs originating in Scandinavia, houses in Norway have had roofs covered with turf and greenery since the Viking and Middle Ages. This was popular because of the weight these materials added to the top of the home, which kept it stable and provided insulation during cold Norwegian winters. Sod roofs were common up until the 18th century when modern industrial material such as tile and corrugated iron were introduced to Norway. However, a modern movement to revive vernacular tradition in the country brought a demand for holiday homes and mountain lodges topped with greenery. Since then, Norway, among other Nordic countries, has been a hotspot for green roof projects and construction.

Norway has also been a leader in developing blue-green roof technologies. With changing climates in the Arctic region, Norway has experienced an increase in torrential rain events each year. Blue-green roof technology provides a solution to the effects of heavy rain on homes and potential flooding. There are still drawbacks to blue-green roofs, which can be costly and require more intensive maintenance to uphold structural integrity. There are ongoing projects in Norway evaluating the risks and benefits of blue-green roofs to establish safer and stronger roofing methods.

=== Poland ===
Several cities in Poland have implemented policies and incentives to encourage the installation of green roofs, including Warsaw, Krakow, and Wroclaw. These policies have helped to increase the adoption of green roofs in the country, particularly in urban areas, where they are seen as an important tool for mitigating the environmental impacts of urbanization and improving the quality of life for city residents. The University of Warsaw green roof is one of the most impressive and well-known examples of green roofs in Poland. It covers an area of approximately 10,000 square meters and includes over 30,000 plants from more than 70 different species.

=== Qatar ===
The Guinness World Record for the largest green roof is held by The Ministry of Municipality and The Public Works Authority (ASHGHAL) in Doha, Qatar, as of September 2023. The green roof covers an area of 4,031 square meters (43,389 square feet), and is part of the governments ongoing efforts for environmental consciousness and the Qatar 2030 Vision.

=== Singapore ===
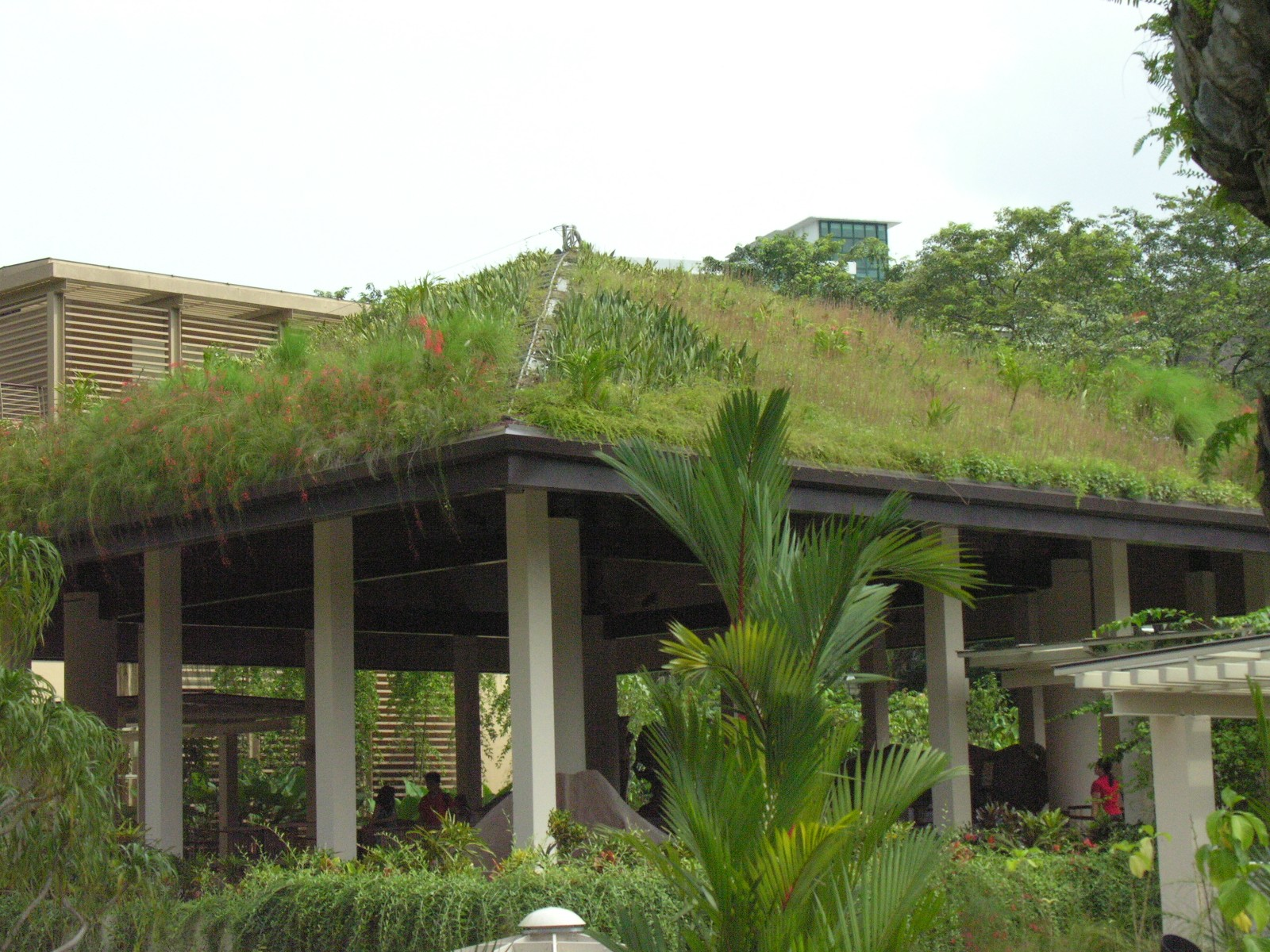
Green roof at Singapore Botanic Gardens.

Singapore installed green roofs on 10 public buses in 2019 as part of an experiment led by researchers at the National University of Singapore. Green roofs on bus stops in Singapore were found to reduce ambient temperatures by up to 2 °C.

=== Switzerland ===
Switzerland has one of Europe's oldest green roofs, created in 1914 at the Moos lake water-treatment plant, Wollishofen, Zürich. Its filter tanks have 30,000 m^{2} (320,000 square feet) of flat concrete roofs. To keep the interior cool and prevent bacterial growth in the filtration beds, a drainage layer of gravel and a 15-centimetre (5.9-inch) layer of soil was spread over the roofs, which had been waterproofed with asphalt. A meadow developed from seeds already present in the soil; it is now a haven for many plant species, some of which are now otherwise extinct in the district, most notably 6,000 Orchis morio (green-winged orchid). More recent Swiss examples can be found at Klinikum 1 and Klinikum 2, the Cantonal Hospitals of Basel, and the Sihlpost platform at Zürich's main railway station.

=== Sweden ===
What is claimed to be the world's first green roof botanical garden was set up in Augustenborg, Malmö, in May 1999. The International Green Roof Institute (IGRI) opened to the public in April 2001 as a research station and educational facility. (It has since been renamed the Scandinavian Green Roof Institute (SGRI), in view of the increasing number of similar organisations around the world.) Green roofs are well-established in Malmö: the Augustenborg housing development near the SGRI botanical garden incorporates green roofs and extensive landscaping of streams, ponds, and soak-ways between the buildings to deal with storm water run-off. The Augustenborg's Botanical Roof Garden is no longer open to visitors and the Scandinavian green roof institute is since mid 2025 no longer operational. Some of the work for promoting green roofs in Sweden is now carried on by the Scandinavian green infrastructure association, a NGO linked to the former institute.

The new Bo01 urban residential development (in the Västra Hamnen (Western Harbour) close to the foot of the Turning Torso office and apartment block, designed by Santiago Calatrava) is built on the site of old shipyards and industrial areas, and incorporates many green roofs.

In 2012, the shopping mall Emporia with its 27,000-square-metre (290,000-square-foot) roof garden, was opened. The size of the roof garden is approximately equivalent to 4 soccer fields, which makes it one of the biggest green roof parks in Europe that is accessible to the public.

=== United Kingdom ===
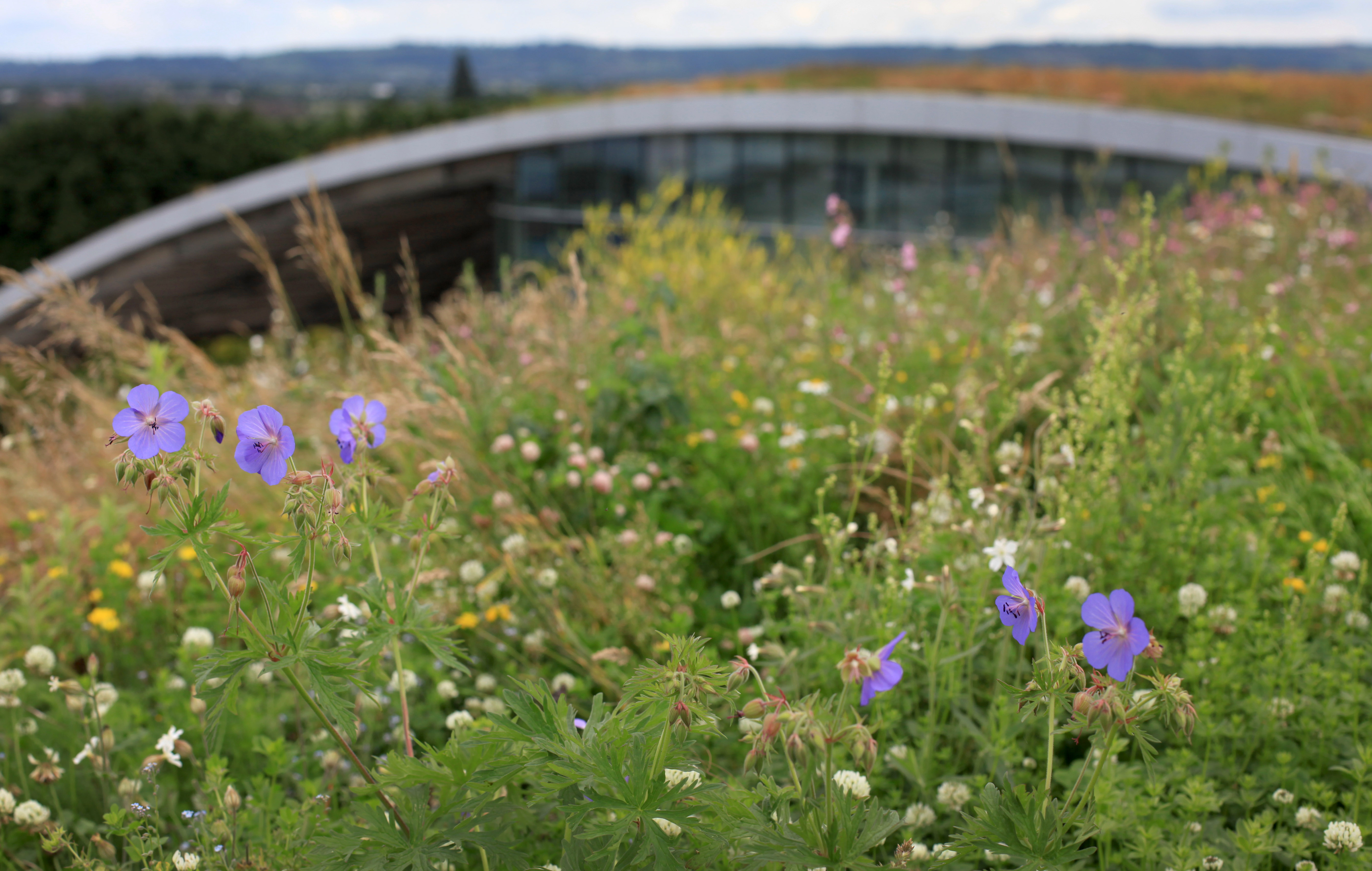
The Sky Garden Wildflower Roof topping the Kanes Salad Factory, Evesham.

In 2003 English Nature concluded that "in the UK policy makers have largely ignored green roofs". However, British examples can be found with increasing frequency. The Kensington Roof Gardens are a notable early roof garden which was built above the former Derry & Toms department store in Kensington, London in 1938. More recent examples can be found at the University of Nottingham Jubilee Campus, and in London at Sainsbury's Millennium Store in Greenwich, the Horniman Museum and at Canary Wharf. The Ethelred Estate, close to the River Thames in central London, is the British capital's largest roof-greening project to date. Toxteth in Liverpool is also a candidate for a major roof-greening project.

In the United Kingdom, intensive green roofs are sometimes used in built-up city areas where residents and workers often do not have access to gardens or local parks. Extensive green roofs are sometimes used to blend buildings into rural surroundings, for example by Rolls-Royce Motor Cars, who has one of the biggest green roofs in Europe (covering more than 32,000 m^{2} (340,000 square feet) on their factory at Goodwood, West Sussex.

The University of Sheffield has created a Green Roof Centre of Excellence and conducted research, particularly in a UK context, into green roofs. Nigel Dunnett of Sheffield University published a UK-centric book about green roofing in 2004 (updated 2008).

Fort Dunlop has the largest green roof in the UK since its redevelopment between 2004 and 2006.

The UK also has one of the most innovative food preparation facilities in Europe, the Kanes salad factory in Evesham. It is topped with a wildflower roof featuring nearly 90 species of wildflower and natural grasses. The seed mix was prepared in consultation with leading ecologists to try to minimise the impact on the local environment. The pre-grown wildflower blanket sits on top of a standing seam roof and is combined with solar panels to create an eco-friendly finish to the entire factory. The development also won the 2013 National Federation of Roofing Contractors Sustainable Roof Award for Green Roofing.

=== United States ===
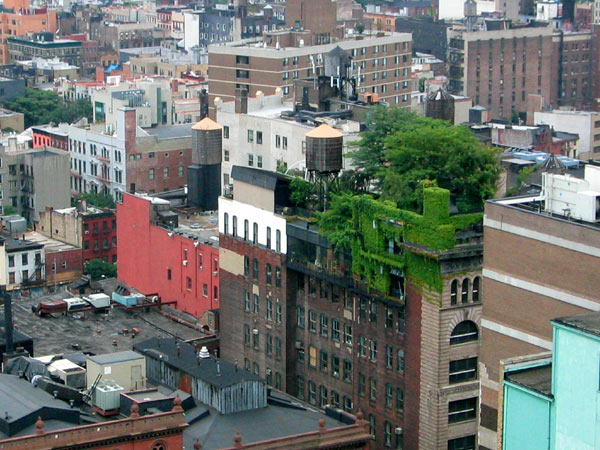
An intensive roof garden in New York City.

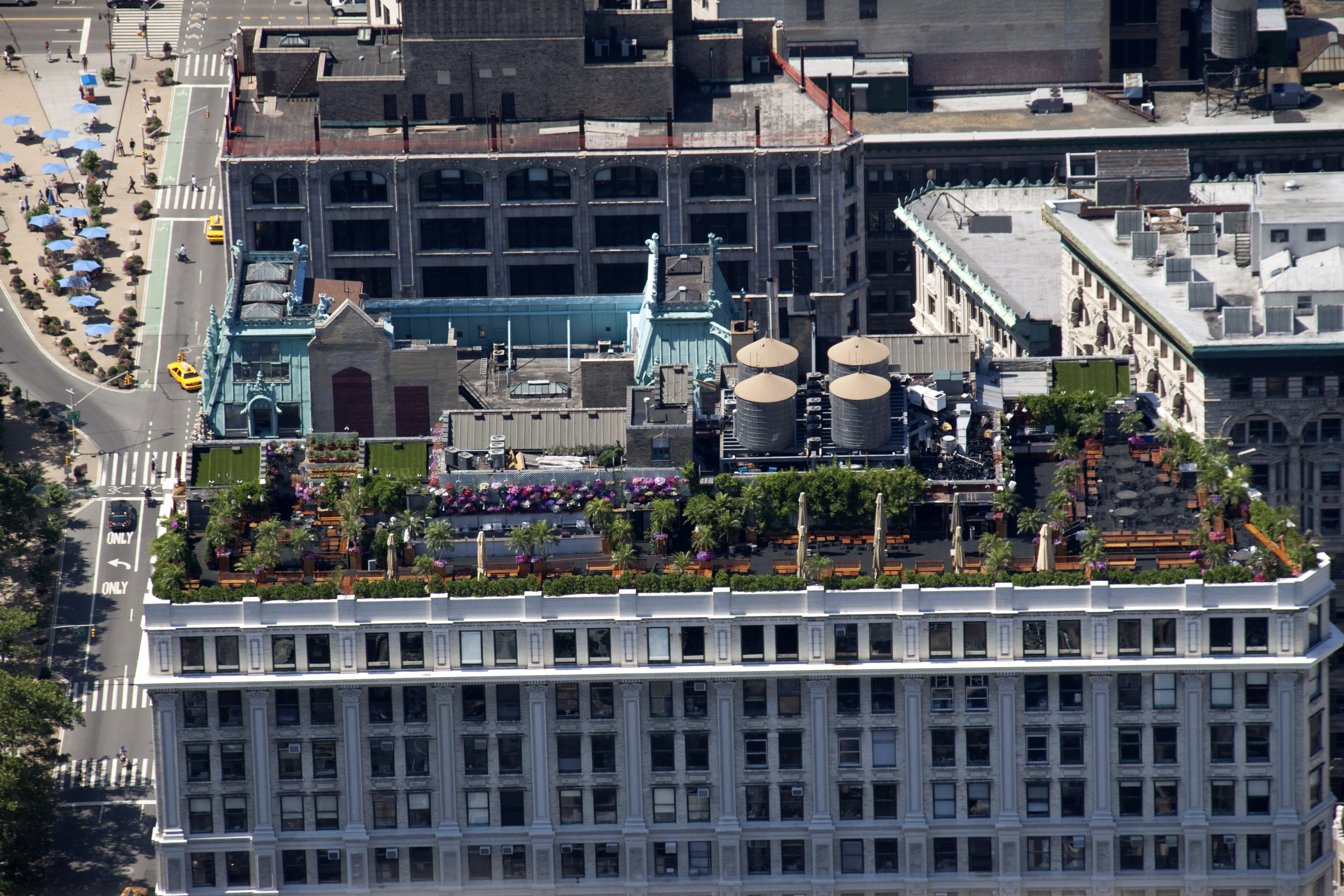
Roof garden in New York.

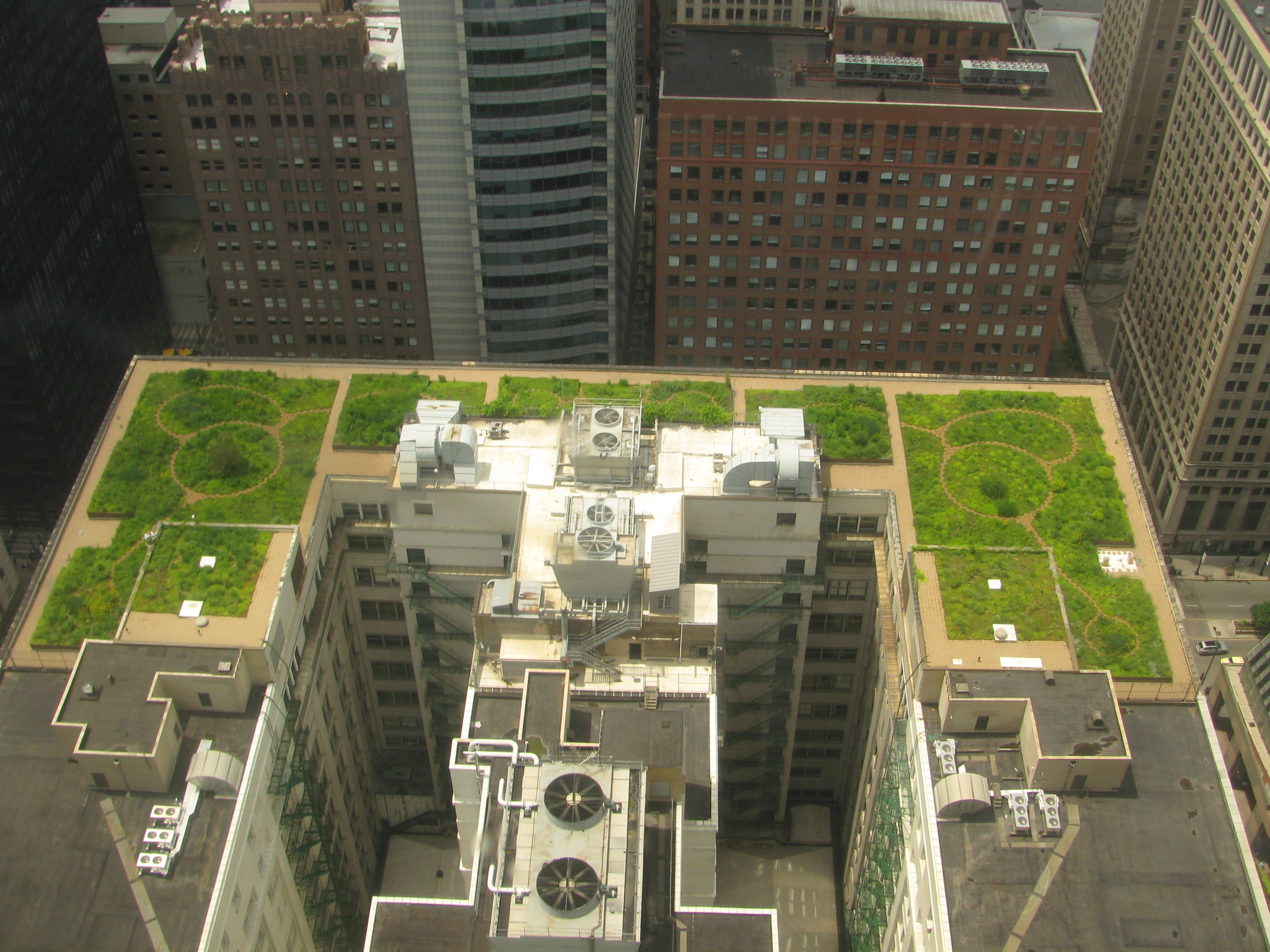
Green roof of Chicago City Hall.

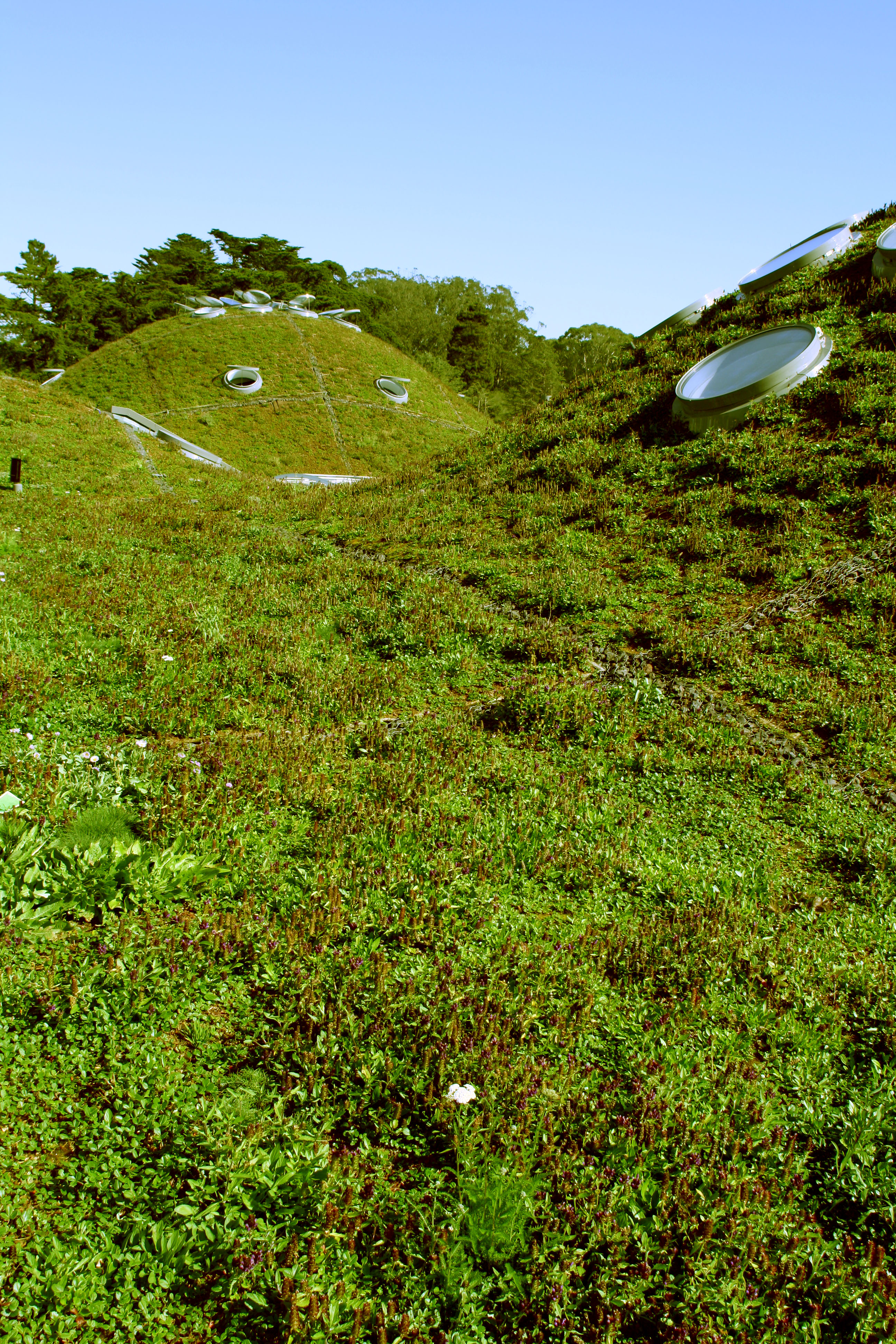
A modern green roof at California Academy of Sciences.

One of the largest expanses of extensive green roof is to be found in the US, at Ford Motor Company's River Rouge Plant, Dearborn, Michigan, where 450,000 square feet (42,000 m^{2}) of assembly plant roofs are covered with sedum and other plants, designed by William McDonough; the $18 million assembly avoids the need of what otherwise would be $50 million worth of mechanical treatment facilities on site. Built over Millennium Park Garage, Chicago's 24.5-acre (9.9 ha) Millennium Park is considered one of the largest intensive green roofs.

Other well-known American examples include Chicago's City Hall and the former Gap headquarters, now the headquarters of YouTube, in San Bruno, California. The US military has two major green roofs in the Washington, D.C. area: the US Coast Guard headquarters (550,000 square feet or 51,000 square metres) and the ATF (55,000 square feet or 5,101 square meters).

An early green-roofed building (completed in 1971) is the 358,000-square-foot (33,300 m^{2}) Weyerhaeuser Corporate Headquarters building in Federal Way, Washington. Its 5-story office roof system comprises a series of stepped terraces covered in greenery. From the air, the building blends into the landscape.

The largest green roof in New York City was installed in midtown Manhattan atop the United States Postal Service's Morgan Processing and Distribution Center. Construction on the 109,000-square-foot (10,100 m^{2}) project began in September 2008, and was finished and dedicated in July 2009. Covered in native vegetation and having an expected lifetime of fifty years, this green roof will not only save the USPS approximately $30,000 a year in heating and cooling costs, but will also significantly reduce the amount of storm water contaminants entering the municipal water system.

In 2001, atop Chicago City Hall, the 38,800-square-foot (3,600 m^{2}) roof gardens were completed, serving as a pilot project to assess the impact green roofs would have on the heat island effect in urban areas, rainwater runoff, and the effectiveness of differing types of green roofs and plant species for Chicago's climate. Although the rooftop is not normally accessible to the public, it is visually accessible from 33 taller buildings in the area. The garden consists of 20,000 plants of more than 150 species, including shrubs, vines and two trees. The green roof design team was headed by the Chicago area firm Conservation Design Forum in conjunction with noted "green" architect William McDonough. With an abundance of flowering plants on the rooftop, beekeepers harvest approximately 200 pounds (90 kg) of honey each year from hives installed on the rooftop. Tours of the green roof are by special arrangement only. Chicago City Hall Green Roof won merit design award of the American Society of Landscape Architecture (ASLA) competition in 2002.

The 14,000 square feet (1,300 m^{2}) of outdoor space on the seventh floor of Zeckendorf Towers, formerly an undistinguished rooftop filled with potted plants, make up the largest residential green roof in New York. The roof was transformed in 2010 as part of Mayor Michael Bloomberg's NYC Green Infrastructure campaign, and supposedly serves to capture some of the rain that falls on it rather than letting it run off and contribute to flooding in the adjacent Union Square subway station.

Some cost can also be attributed to maintenance. Extensive green roofs have low maintenance requirements but they are generally not maintenance free. German research has quantified the need to remove unwanted seedlings to approximately 6 seconds/m^{2}/year. Maintenance of green roofs often includes fertilization to increase flowering and succulent plant cover. If aesthetics are not an issue, fertilization and maintenance are generally not needed. Extensive green roofs should only be fertilized with controlled-release fertilizers in order to avoid pollution of the storm water. Conventional fertilizers should never be used on extensive vegetated roofs. German studies have approximated the nutrient requirement of vegetated roofs to 5 gN/m^{2}. It is also important to use a substrate that does not contain too many available nutrients. The FLL guidelines specify maximum-allowable nutrient content of substrates.

One of the oldest American green roofs in existence is atop the Rockefeller Center in Manhattan, built in 1936. This roof was primarily an aesthetic undertaking for the enjoyment of the center's workers, and remains to this day, having been refurbished in 1986.

With the passage of Denver's Green Roof Initiative in the November 2017 elections, effective January 2018, new buildings or existing buildings meeting the initiative's thresholds are required to have rooftop gardens, optionally combined with solar photovoltaic panels.

Seattle is another city in which green roofs have been used on an increasing basis. This phenomenon is in large part due to efforts on behalf of the city to encourage green roofs through new and improved building codes. In 2006, the Seattle Green Factor program was approved. The program rewards the incorporation of landscaping in new building developments in an attempt to reduce stormwater runoff and associated pollution, stabilize temperatures, and create habitats for birds and insects. These changes were expanded in 2009 to recognize the specific stormwater benefits of green roofs, and to reward developers who used them accordingly.

By 2010, Seattle was home to approximately 8.25 acres (3.34 hectares) of green roofs. Despite initial hiccups in the city stemming from weeds, lack of irrigation during dry summer months, and a need for continuous replanting, the project has continued to succeed as understanding around the best soils and plants and the need for monitoring and upkeep has increased. A 2010 survey of the green roofs in Seattle acknowledged that while the initial costs of implementing a green roof may deter businesses or homeowners, it is likely that green roofs actually preserve the roofing material and cut costs in the long run. In light of the success in Seattle, other cities such as Portland, Chicago, and Washington, D.C. have all made efforts to develop their own Green Factor programs.

The Seattle City Hall has led the way by implementing a green roof project that has involved the planting of more than 22,000 pots of sedum, fescue, and grass. The City hopes that the project can reduce the annual stormwater runoff for the building by 50 to 75 percent, which will in turn reduce damage to local watershed areas that provide habitats for native species such as salmon. The historic Union Stables building has used green roofs alongside other efficiency based changes to reduce stormwater runoff and decrease the building's energy use by 70 percent. The Park Place building in Seattle's downtown provides a leading example of the use of landscaping to recapture rain water with the hopes of cutting back spending on utilities.

==== Washington, D.C. ====
Washington, D.C., started implementing incentives for green roofs within their city at the beginning of the 21st century. In 2003, the Chesapeake Bay Foundation introduced a "green roof demonstration project" in combination with the D.C. Water and Sewer Authority. This program issued grants to several pilot green roofs, which would assist with the cost of construction for the building owner. From this project the city began to understand how beneficial these roofs could be and more programs were implemented over the years. In 2007, the Riversmart Rewards Program introduced a RiverSmart Rooftops Green Roof Rebate Program that would lend a $3 per square foot subsidy to potential green roof projects within the District. This culminated to assist 12 projects that year.

A year later, the subsidy was raised to $5, incentivizing even more developers to use this program within their design. There is also possibility through the RiverSmart Rewards program for "residents and property owners to receive a significant discount on their water utility fees" if they install approved stormwater management features.

In 2016, a rebate of $10–15 per square feet was introduced, "promoting the voluntary installation of green roofs for the purpose of reducing stormwater runoff and pollutants". $10 per square foot rebates were set for installation within a combined sewer system. $15 per square foot rebates were set for installation within a municipal storm sewer system. The greatest aspect of this incentivized project is the lack of restriction of building type that qualifies. There is no size cap on properties that qualify whether it is residential, commercial or institutional. In 2016 there was a total of 2.3 million square feet of green roofing within the district. As of 2020, there is 5.1 million square feet of green roofing.

== See also ==
- Arcology
- Blue roof
- Covering (construction)
- Ecovillage
- Energy-efficient landscaping
- Hanging Gardens of Babylon
- Low-impact development
- Rainwater harvesting
- Ralph Hancock, designer, The Rockefeller Center Roof Gardens
- Roof garden
- Sod roof, traditional roof in Scandinavia
- Sustainable city
- Subtropical climate vegetated roof
- Turbine ventilator
- Windcatcher
