= Subtropical climate vegetated roof =

A subtropical climate vegetated roof (SCV roof) is a type of green building practice that employs a planted soil media installed above a waterproof roof deck to obtain environmental benefits and address sustainability concerns, similar to traditional green roofs located in northern continental United States. Soil media, plant palettes, and green roof systems that can adapt to the adverse weather conditions and physical characteristics of the humid, subtropical regions of the United States are utilized in the construction and design of subtropical climate vegetated roofs.

Green roofs are used for various reasons including: urban oasis, storm water mitigation, carbon reduction, energy conservation, aesthetics, and therapeutic values depending on the geographic location and the intended specific goals of the project. Most of the current green roof research pertains to northern parts of the continental United States, whereas, very limited research has been conducted in humid, subtropical regions.

Although similar characteristics and principles exist, there are several differences between the two types of environmentally sound roofing systems. These differences are comparable to the differences found between regions of the United States in conventional landscaping and gardening or the variations found in forms of landscaping. Plant species and landscaping methods utilized in northern parts of the United States are not suitable for humid, subtropical regions of United States due to the extreme temperatures and rain events that occur. This accounts for the most significant difference between a green roof in northern United States and a subtropical climate vegetated roof (SCV roof).

A subtropical climate vegetated roof that is well designed according to the specific geographic locations climate can lower roof surface temperatures by as much 38° and depending on the amount of the event retain up to 88% of rainfall. An improperly designed subtropical climate vegetated (SCV roof) using incorrect soil media and plant species can fail by not achieving the intended goals. This roofing method also contributes towards growing the green economy, sustainable energy technology policies, and qualifies for Federal and local tax incentives, set in place by the United States government.

== Technology and terminology ==
Compared with other parts of the United States, the number of vegetated roofs currently in the Southeast is significantly less. Vegetated roofs in humid subtropical regions rely on the same core green roof terminologies that are used throughout the world and other parts of the United States. Extensive, intensive, soil media, ballast, filter fabric, drainage layer, waterproof membrane are some of the core green roof component terms associated with SCV roofs.

Regional terms, plant palettes, and technologies are forming to adapt to recent innovations and increased popularity of green roofs in the humid, subtropical regions of the United States. All forms of green roofs have the potential to retain stormwater on the roof surface and lower the thermal loading on buildings. Due to high temperatures, prolonged heat, and excessive amounts of precipitation, humid subtropical regions of the United States receive the greatest environmental benefits provided by SCV roofs, which are: reduced rainwater input into storm water retention systems during rainfall and increased energy performance ratings in buildings. SCV and green roofs increase energy efficiencies of buildings by stabilizing roof surface temperatures. In other regions of the United States, the greatest environmental benefits of green roof design may be different based upon the type of climate the area possesses.

Recent advancements in soil engineering and plastic technologies allow vegetated roofs the ability to adapt to different locations within the humid, subtropical region of the United States. Soil media moisture content and capacity levels can be regulated by using soil elements that adapt to the climate of each specific geographic location and client needs. The amount of moisture retained depends on the maximum moisture retention capacity, the permeability and the depth of the soil media. High density plastics permit SCV roof systems to withstand the weather elements and adjust to varying building types of the region.

As defined by green roof industry standards, extensive green roofs have a soil media of less than 6 inches in depth and intensive green roofs have a soil media of more than 6 inches in depth. Most SCV roofs that are greater than 6 inches in depth are expensive and found on residential high rise structures, often containing pools and other amenities.

An SCV roofs requires a unique soil media mixture to adapt to the harsh weather conditions and physical characteristics of the southern United States. Expanded shall and clay are typically used to form a base and comprise up to 90% of some soil media mixtures used throughout the United States. Perlite, vermiculite, ash, tire crumbs, sand, peat moss, and recycled vegetation are some of the other elements utilized in soil media engineering. Albedo and heat transfer rates are key variables to consider when designing an SCV roof and do not have a significant effect on green roofs in the northern continental United States.

There are three basic SCV and green roof systems available in today's market: built-up, modular, and mat. These systems vary from manufacture to manufacture and are composed of different materials such as: foam, high density plastic, and fabrics. Many of the systems have geographic limitations and do not perform well in humid, subtropical regions based upon the intent of the system and the materials being used.

== Built-up ==
Multi-layered systems containing the following functional layers: root barrier, protection layer, drainage layer, filter layer, growing medium and plant level.

== Modular systems ==
Self-contained units, typically square in shape, that require only the soil medium and vegetative layer for a functioning green roof. These systems are easy to install and remove. Some modular systems are pre-grown at nurseries to client specifications, forming an instant vegetative layer.

== Mat systems ==
Singled-layered systems of this type are drained by a multi-layer fabric mat called a “drainage mat” that combines soil separation, drainage, and protection functions. Current research suggests that the depth of the soil media, material, and number of layers affect the success rate of an individual green or SCV roof.

== Suitable plant pallets ==
A suitable plant species for SCV roofs consist of the following features: drought tolerant, minimal root structure, minimal height, ability to form a vegetative mat, non-rangy, heat tolerant, frost tolerant, and the ability to adapt to a non-traditional soil media. Plant species that have extensive root system and tend to be rangy can puncture waterproofing elements or grow into unwanted areas causing mold and mildew. Water, high nutrient, and shade-dependent plants are not suitable for SCV roofs and should be avoided and can lead to expensive failures.

Some of the most successful SCV roof plant species are in the families Crassulaceae and Aizoaceae, which are CAM plants. A plant that uses the crassulacean acid metabolism (CAM) as an adaptation for arid conditions. CO_{2} entering the stomata during the night is converted into organic acids, which release [[CO_{2}]] for the Calvin Cycle during the day, when the stomata are closed. CAM plants often show xerophytic features, such as thick, reduced leaves with a low surface-area-to-volume ratio, thick cuticle, and stomata sunken into pits.

Green roofs in the northern continental United States rely on sedums which are in the family Crassulaceae. Most varieties of Sedums are not appropriate for humid, subtropical climates and experience root rot and disease problems due to high temperatures and humidity levels. However, two Sedum cultivars, ‘Lemon Coral’ and’ Florida Friendly Gold’ are currently being researched at the University of Florida and appear to be adapting to the humid, subtropical climate of Gainesville, Florida.

Example SCV roof plant palette

Common name	Scientific name	Cultivar	Family	Recommended size	Spacing	Growth habit
Sedum	Sedum rupestre	'Lemon Coral'	Crassulaceae	4"	18"	Spreading groundcover
Ice Plant	Delosperma cooperi	n/a	Aizoaceae	4"	24"	Spreading groundcover
Dianthus	Dianthus gratianopolitanus	'Firewitch'	Caryophyllaceae	1 gallon	18"	Clumping Groundcover
Bugleweed	Ajuga reptans	'ChocolateChip'	Laminaceae	1 gallon	18"	Spreading Groundcover
Moss Verbena	Verbena tenuisecta	n/a	Verbenaceae	4"	24"	Spreading groundcover

== Challenges ==
SCV roofs confront a magnitude of challenges due to the adverse weather conditions of the Southeastern United States. High humidity levels, excessive rain amounts, prolonged heat, mold, mildew, insects, disease, weeds, soil borne disease, maintenance concerns, and sloped roofs are the major challenges faced in designing a SCV roof. High humidity levels, excessive rain amounts, prolonged heat lead to decreased plant health on CAM plants that are standard in green roof design. The decreased plant health causes diseases, insects, root rot, and plant fatality.

Soil-borne diseases occur more frequently due to warm, rainy, humid environment rhythm of the humid, subtropical region. SCV roof plants are researched and tested at several different universities throughout the southeast to avoid system failure and economic loses. Mold and mildew can form on areas of the roof and building when proper ventilation is not taken into consideration and are also repercussions of high humidity levels and prolonged heat.

One of the greatest challenges to SCV roofs can be hurricanes. The strong hurricane winds can cause uplifting of the roofs. High winds can scour the growth media where the plants are established. Scouring is the blowing of the particles in the growth media from the surface of the vegetated roof, thereby reducing the volume and weight of growth media and its ability to ballast the green roof.

Sloped roofs that are prevalent in the southeastern United States also pose a significant challenge for SCV roofs. Soil media erosion and poor plant establishment are the most common problems and can occur on any angle of sloped roof if not designed properly. Erosion blankets and green roof soil media stabilization products are used to mitigate the effects of sloped roofs. Flat roofs and low sloped roofs are conventional roof slopes by the building industry in the southeastern United States and allow for successful implementation of SCV roofs.

=== Standard roof slopes ===
Flat roofs – 1% to 2% slope

Low slope-3:12 to 5:12

Medium Slope-6:12 to 9:12

High Slope-10:12 to 12:12

Subtropical regions in the US where SCV roofs could apply

Here are some of the states where humid subtropical climates can be found:

- Eastern half of Texas
- Louisiana
- Arkansas
- Alabama
- Mississippi
- North Carolina
- South Carolina
- Tennessee
- Georgia
- Kentucky
- most of Florida
- Virginia
- southern West Virginia

The climate in many of these states can vary and be extreme.

Benefits (Performance ratings)

- Reduces stormwater volume (50%–85%)
- Improves stormwater quality through load reduction
- Saves water by rainwater harvesting
- Reduces heat island effect
- Lowers surface temperatures by 40–50 degrees Fahrenheit
- Energy savings can reach 15%–30%
- Reduces noise for building occupants
- Increases the life of the roof and reduces roof maintenance
- Contributes to biodiversity and creates habitats for birds and invertebrates
- Filters air pollutant particles
- Increased storm event safety
- Neighborhood diversity
- Aesthetic value
- Reduces need for retention ponds and ditches

=== Costs ===
Initially, vegetated roofs can have a high short-term capital but the long-term energy and maintenance savings outweigh them. Even the U.S. Green Building Council and some new advances in green roofs suggest that green buildings don't necessarily have to cost more than a conventional one.

== Successful examples ==
Project name: Shadow Wood Preserve Green Roof Demonstration

- Location: Ft. Myers, FL, USA
- Size: 2400 sq.ft.

Project name: Charles R. Perry Construction Yard, University of Florida

- Location: Gainesville, FL, USA
- Size: 2600 sq.ft.

Project name: Student Union Expansion at the University of Central Florida (UCF)

- Location: Orlando, FL, USA
- Size: 1600 sq ft
