= Steven W. Peck =

Steven Peck is founder and president of Green Roofs for Healthy Cities, a non-profit industry association promoting the planning, designing and building of green roof, green walls and other architecture projects. Green Roofs was established in 1999.

Peck holds an honors B.A. from McGill University in Political Science and Economics. In 1999 he co-authored a federal government report on barriers to green roof technology diffusion called “Green Backs for Green Roofs.” Peck is an "Editor-at-Large" and publisher of the Living Architecture Monitor magazine , a quarterly publication that his organization puts out. It profiles green roof, living wall, urban agriculture profiles, developments and research in North America. He is the founder of the Annual International Greening Rooftops for Sustainable Communities Conference, Awards and Trade Show.
