= List of commercially available roofing materials =

Roofing material is the outermost layer on the roof of a building, sometimes self-supporting, but generally supported by an underlying structure. A building's roofing material provides shelter from the natural elements. The outer layer of a roof shows great variation dependent upon availability of material, and the nature of the supporting structure. Those types of roofing material which are commercially available range from natural products such as thatch and slate to commercially produced products such as tiles and polycarbonate sheeting. Roofing materials may be placed on top of a secondary water-resistant material called underlayment.

== Steep slope roofing materials ==
Steep roof materials are roofs that are only recommended where water can freely and openly drain off the edge of the roof without retaining water for too long. The aim is to drain off water completely due to the high water permeability of most of these materials, for instance: the Thatched roofs. In areas where the International Build Code or similar is utilized, the minimum slope required is 2:12, though some countries extend this as high as 4:12

=== Thatch ===
Thatch roofing is typically made of plant stalks in overlapping layers.

- Wheat straw, widely used in England, France, and other parts of Europe
- Seagrass, used in coastal areas where there are estuaries such as Scotland. Has a longer life than straw. Claimed to have a life in excess of 60 years.
- Rye straw, commonly used in a barn.
- Raffia palm leaves; a well organised raffia palm leaves is mainly used as roof houses in Nigeria, especially among the Igbo.
- Rice straw, commonly used in Eastern Asia.
- Water reed, commonly used in Ireland for thatching.

=== Shingle ===
A shingle is the generic term for an individual roofing unit that is applied with other such units in an overlapping fashion.

- Wood shingle, shingles sawn from bolts of wood such as red cedar which has a useful performance life expectancy of up to 30 years. However, young growth red cedar has a short life expectancy and high cost. In the United States and Canada, eastern white cedar is also used. Some hardwoods were very durable roofing found in Colonial Australian and American colonial architecture; their use is usually limited to building restoration. All wood shingles benefit by being allowed to breathe (dry out from below).
- Shake (shingle), Are different than wood shingles in that they are split on one side and sawed on the back side. Commonly referred to as "resawn shakes". A cedar shake is not the same as a cedar shingle.
- Asphalt shingle made of bitumen embedded in an organic or fiberglass mat, usually covered with colored, man-made ceramic grit. Cheaper than slate or tiles. The reduced cost of this particular style of roofing is especially apparent in its application and removal. Installation is very streamlined and a rapid process. Depending on the size of the roof and the experience of the crew, it is possible to remove old shingles and apply new ones on 2-3 houses in one day. Life span varies. Use only on slanted roofs.
- Rubber shingle, an alternative to asphalt shingle, slate, shake or tile. Made primarily of rubber, often recycled tire-derived rubber. Other typical ingredients include binders, UV (ultraviolet light) inhibitors and color. Warranted and designed to last at least 50 years in most cases.
- Asbestos shingles. Very long lifespan, fireproof, and low cost but rarely used anymore because of health concerns.
- Stone slab. Heavy stone slabs (not to be confused with slate) 1–2 inches thick were formerly used as roofing tiles in some regions in England, the Alps, and Scandinavia. Stone slabs require a very heavyweight roof structure, but their weight makes them stormproof. An obsolete roofing material, they are used commercially only for building restoration.
  - Collyweston stone slate named after the village of Collyweston
- Solar shingle
- Metal shakes or shingles. Long life. High cost, suitable for roofs of 3:12 pitch or greater. Because of the flexibility of metal, they can be manufactured to lock together, giving durability and reducing assembly time. For a discussion of copper system shingles, see Copper in architecture#Wall cladding.

=== Slate ===
While slates have high cost, they have a life expectancy of 80 to 400 years. See the article slate industry for an overview including names of quarries. Some of the famous quarries where the highest quality slate comes from that are available in Australia are Bethesda in Wales and areas of Spain.

=== Ceramic tile ===
Tile roofing traditionally consists of locally available materials such as clay, granite, terracotta or slate, though many modern applications contain concrete.

- Imbrex and tegula, style dating back to ancient Greece and Rome.
- Monk and nun, a style similar to Imbrex and tegula, but basically using two Imbrex tiles.
- Dutch roof tiles, Netherlands
- Mangalore tiles, India

=== Metal roofing ===
Metal roofing is any of a large variety of roof coverings made from metal and is characterized by its high resistance, impermeability, and longevity. While there are an infinite variety of how to produce metal roofing, thicknesses, and types for metal/finishes used, roofing is generally grouped into 2 categories: Exposed Fastener Panels and Hidden Fastener Panels. Exposed Fastener panels are held down by fasteners through the outside of the metal, whereas Hidden Fastener Panels are held by hidden fasteners, clips, and sometimes adhesives. Typical metals include Galvanized Steel, Galvalume, Aluminum, Copper, or Vinyl 9Which while not metal is included in many cases for its matching profiles).

- Corrugated galvanised iron is galvanised steel manufactured with wavy corrugations to resist lateral flexing and fitted with exposed fasteners. Widely used for low cost and durability. Sheds are normally roofed with this material. Gal iron or Corro was the most extensively used roofing material of 20th century Australia, but replaced in popularity by steel with longer-lasting, coloured, alloy coatings.
- Copper roofs can last for hundreds of years. Copper roofing offers durability, ease of fabrication, lighter weight than some other roofing materials, can be curved, low maintenance, corrosion resistance, low thermal movement, lightning protection, radio frequency shielding, and are 100% recyclable. Copper roofs have a high initial cost but very long lifetime: tests on European copper roofs from the 18th Century showed that, in theory, copper roofs can last one thousand years. Another advantage of copper roofing systems is that they are relatively easy to repair.
- Standing-seam metal roof with concealed fasteners.
- Mechanically seamed metal with concealed fasteners contains sealant in seams for use on very low sloped roofs, suitable for roofs of low pitch such as 0.5/12 to 3/12 pitch.
- Flat-seam metal with or without soldered seams.
- Steel coated with a coloured alloy of zinc and aluminium.
- Stone-coated metal roofing.

== Low slope roofing materials ==
Low slope materials include roofing materials that can be installed at below 2:12 slope, although in the majority of cases low slope materials can also be installed at steeper slopes.

=== Membrane roofing ===
Membrane roofing consists of large sheets, generally fused in some way at the joints to form a continuous surface.

- Cured Thermoset membrane (e.g. EPDM rubber, Neoprene). Synthetic rubber Cured Thermosets are synthetic rubbers that have undergone the vulcanization or "Curing" process. Seams of materials are bonded by adhesives or chemicals, which over time weaken and separate unless maintained or reinforced. The most commonly used Cured Elastomer membranes are Ethylene Propylene Diene Monomer (commonly EPDM) and Neoprene.
- Uncured Thermoset membrane (e.g. CSPE, CPE, NBP, PIB) Uncured elastomers are installed in a manner similar to thermoplastics in that they can be heat or solvent welded. The material then cures over time once exposed to the elements, and then exhibits the same qualities as vulcanized elastomers. The most commonly used Uncured Elastomers are Chlorosulfonated Polyethylene (CSPE), Chlorinated Polyethylene (CPE), Polyisobutylene (PIB), Nitrile Butadiene Polymer (NBP).
- Thermoplastics (e.g. PVC, TPO) – Plastic sheets welded together with hot air, creating one continuous sheet membrane. Lends itself well to both big box and small roof application because of its hot air weldability. This membrane is installed by two methods: 1.) Rolls of membrane are attached to the ridged insulation using a bonding adhesive; 2.) The edge of each roll is fastened through ridged insulation into structural deck, and the proceeding roll is lapped over the fasteners. The overlap is then heat-welded with hot air to create a mechanically fastened thermoplastic roof. PVC is also known as IB.Vinyl roof membrane.

=== Liquid roofing ===
Liquid roofing includes:

- Asphalt roll roofing including single and double coverage types.
- Acrylic Based liquid roofing.
- Silicone based liquid roofing.
- Neoprene Based liquid roofing.
- Butyl/Rubber Based liquid roofing.

=== Modified bitumen ===
Modified bitumen are long rolls of asphalt-based materials, that can be heat-welded, self-adhering asphalt-adhered, or installed with adhesive. Asphalt is mixed with polymers such as APP or SBS, then applied to fiberglass and/or polyester mat, seams sealed by locally melting the asphalt with heat, hot mopping of asphalt, or adhesive. Lends itself well to most applications.

=== Built-up roof membrane ===
Built-up roofs (BURs) consist of multiple plies of bitumen-coated organic felt, polyester felt, or coated fiberglass felts. Three to five plies of felt are laminated to each other and to the substrate with hot asphalt, coal tar pitch, or made-for-purpose cold adhesive. Although the roof membrane can be left bare, it is typically covered with a thick flood coat of the bituminous adhesive and covered with gravel, mineral granules, or a reflective coating, each of which protects the BUR from ultraviolet (UV) light degradation (UV causes evaporation of tar and oxidation of asphalt). Gravel not only provides UV protection, it also helps accommodate sudden temperature changes (thermal shock), protects the surface from hail and mechanical damage, and increases the weight of the roof system to resist wind blow-off.

- Fabric
- Polyester
- PTFE, (synthetic fluoropolymer) embedded in fibreglass

=== Concrete or fibre cement ===
Concrete roofing is composed of concrete reinforced with fibers of some sort.

- Structural concrete can also be used for flat roof constructions. There are three main categories, precast/prestressed, cast-in-place and shell. There are many types of precast/prestressed concrete roofing. The following are the most common types.
- Double tees are the most common products for short spans up to 60 feet (18 m)
- Hollow-core slabs are used when there is a need for flushed ceiling.
- T-beams are similar to double tees but can be used for span ranging from 30 feet (9.1 m) to 100 feet (30 m).
- Joists and planks are combination of using prestressed joists with prestressed planks. Keystone-shape joists can be used for up to 36-foot (11 m) spans and tee-shape joists can be used for up to 60-foot (18 m) span.

== Other components ==
=== Underlayments ===
- Tar paper and felt paper
- Synthetic underlayment
- Ice and water shield

=== Insulations and cover boards ===
- Gyspum Roof Boards
- Concrete Roof Boards
- Expanded Polystyrene (EPS)
- Extruded Polystyrene (XPS)
- Polyisocyanurate (ISO)
- Wood Fiber Insulation
- Fire Sheet
- Fiberboard
- Fiberglass
- Mineral Wool
- Spray Foam

=== Drip edge ===
- Drip edge is a metal installed to the edges of a roof deck, after the roofing material is installed. The metal may be galvanized steel, aluminum, PVC, copper and possibly others.

== Gallery ==
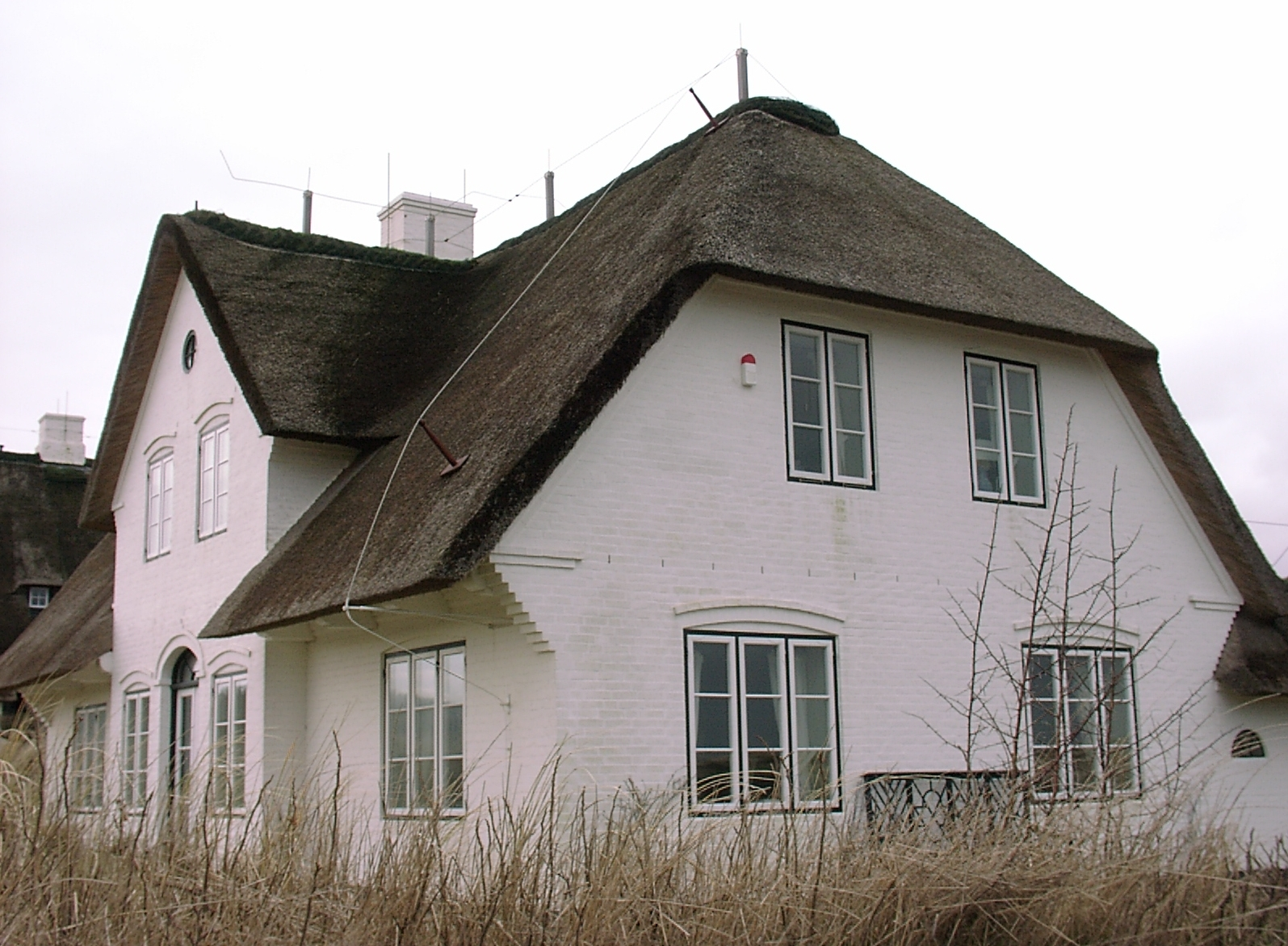
Reed thatch on the island of Sylt

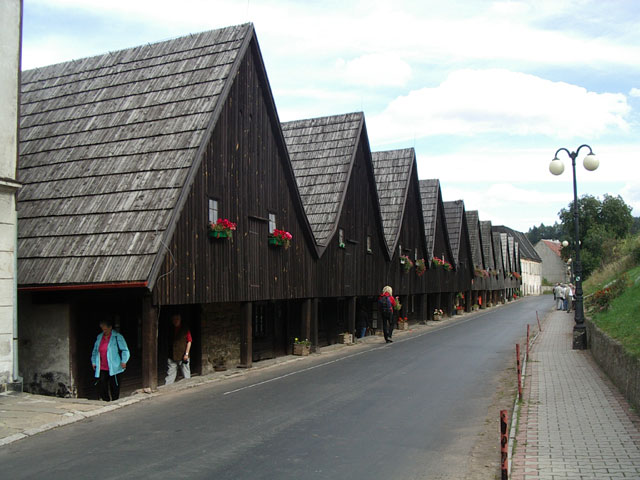
Wooden shingles, Poland

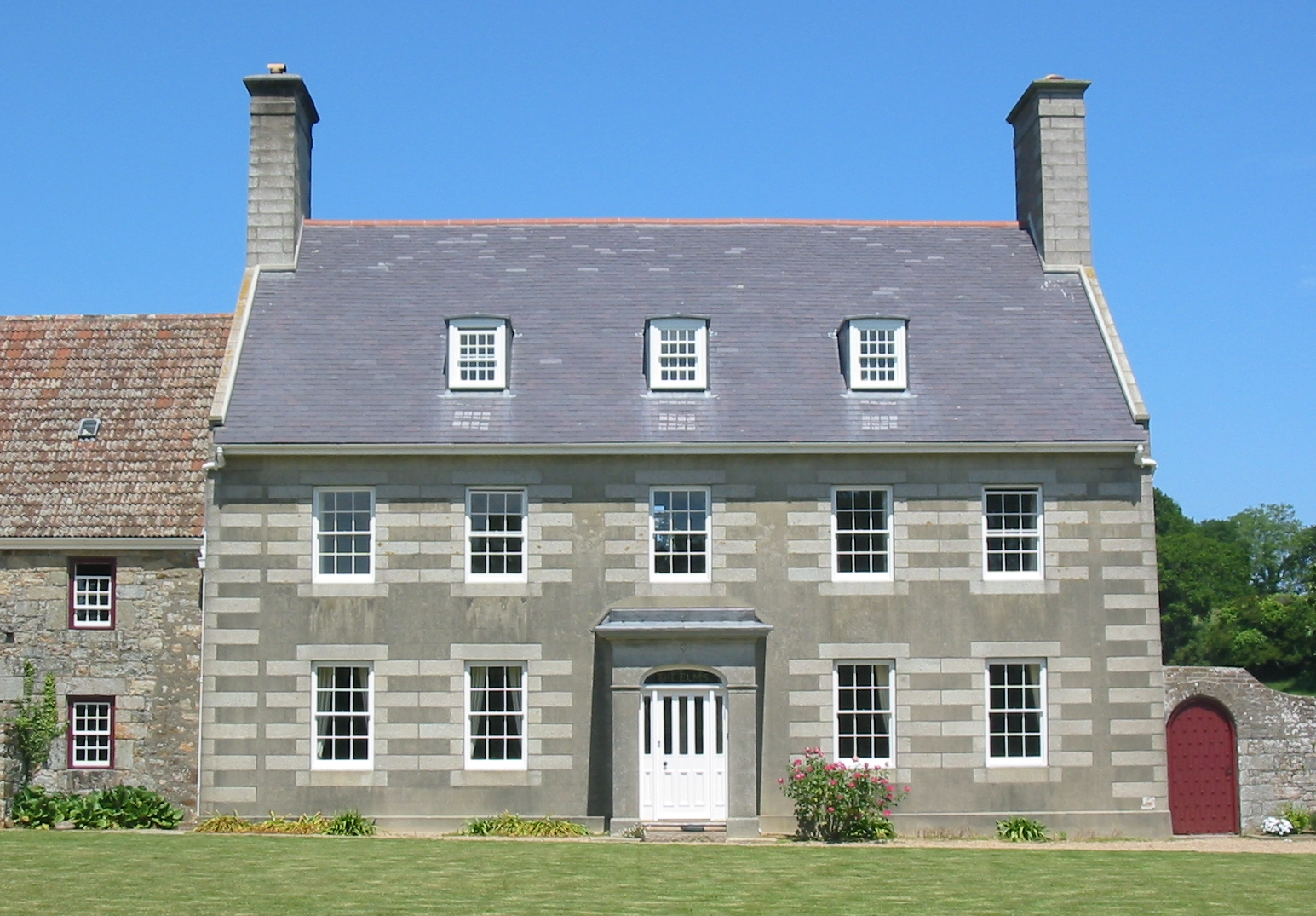
Slate, England

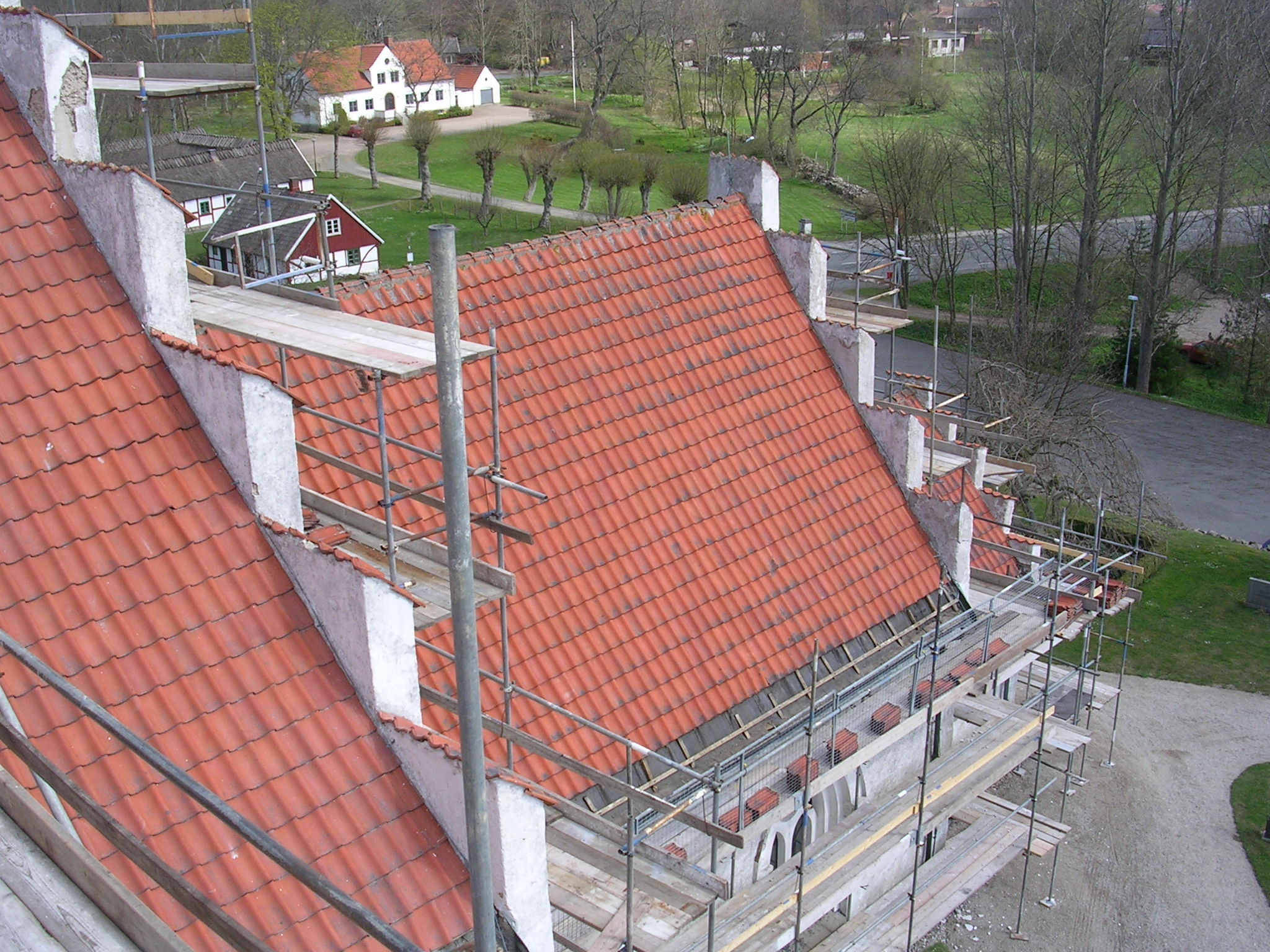
A church roof under repair with terracotta tiles

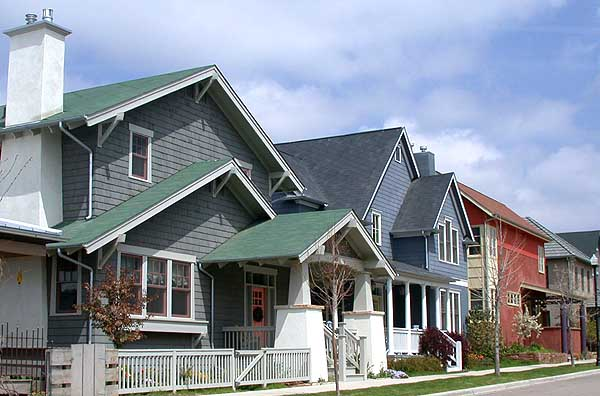
Asphalt Shingles, United States

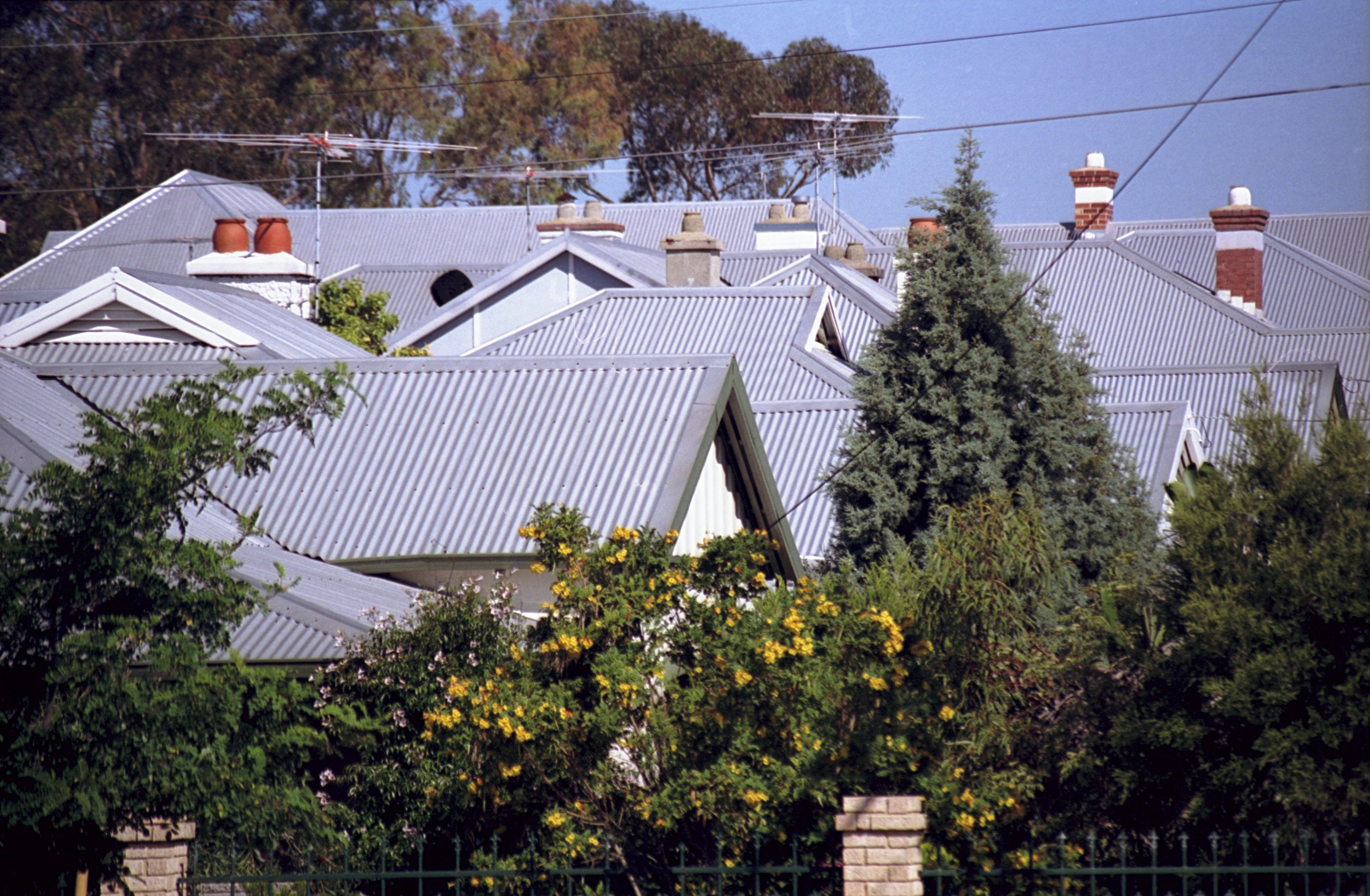
Corrugated iron, Australia

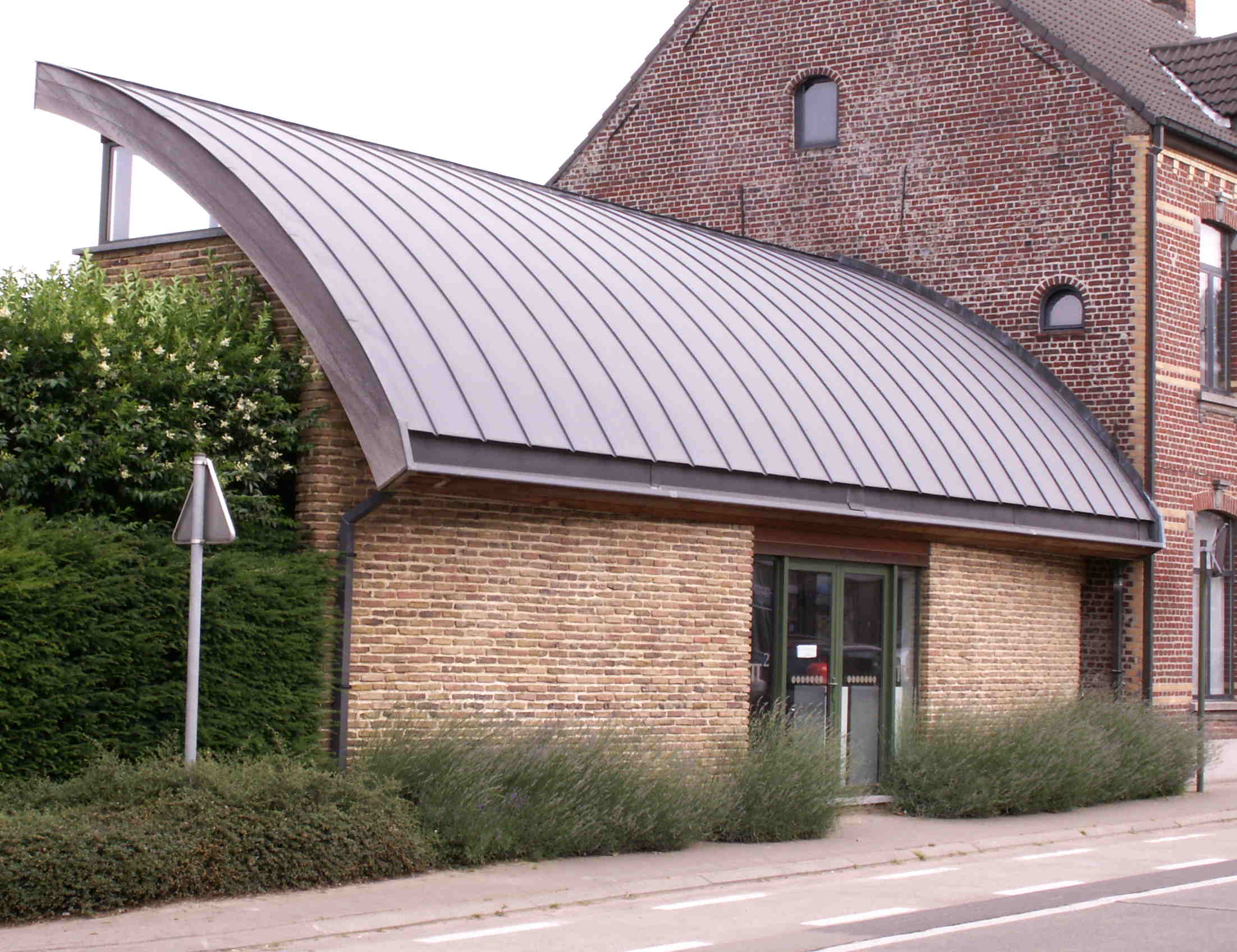
Sheet metal roof

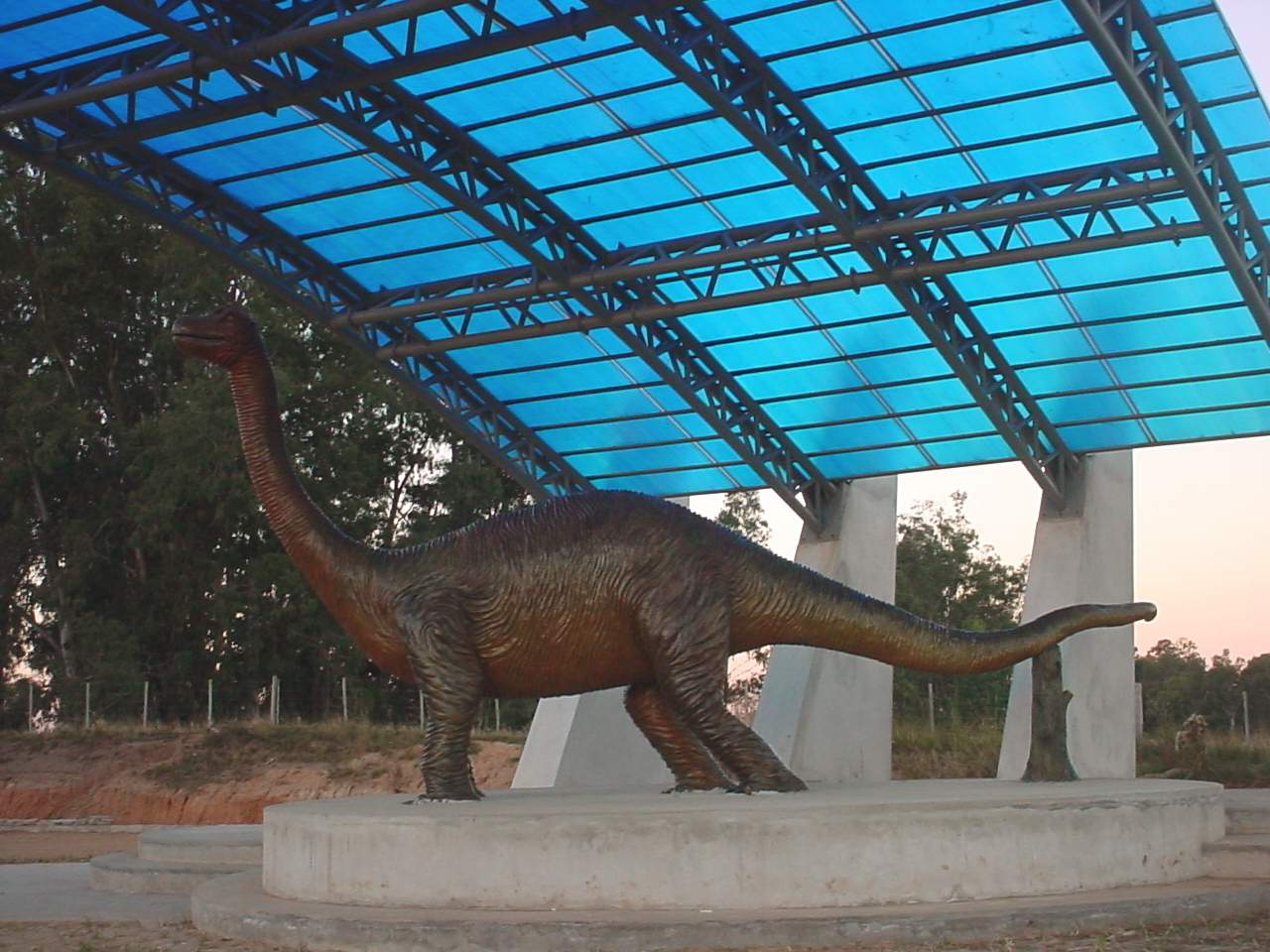
PVC roof

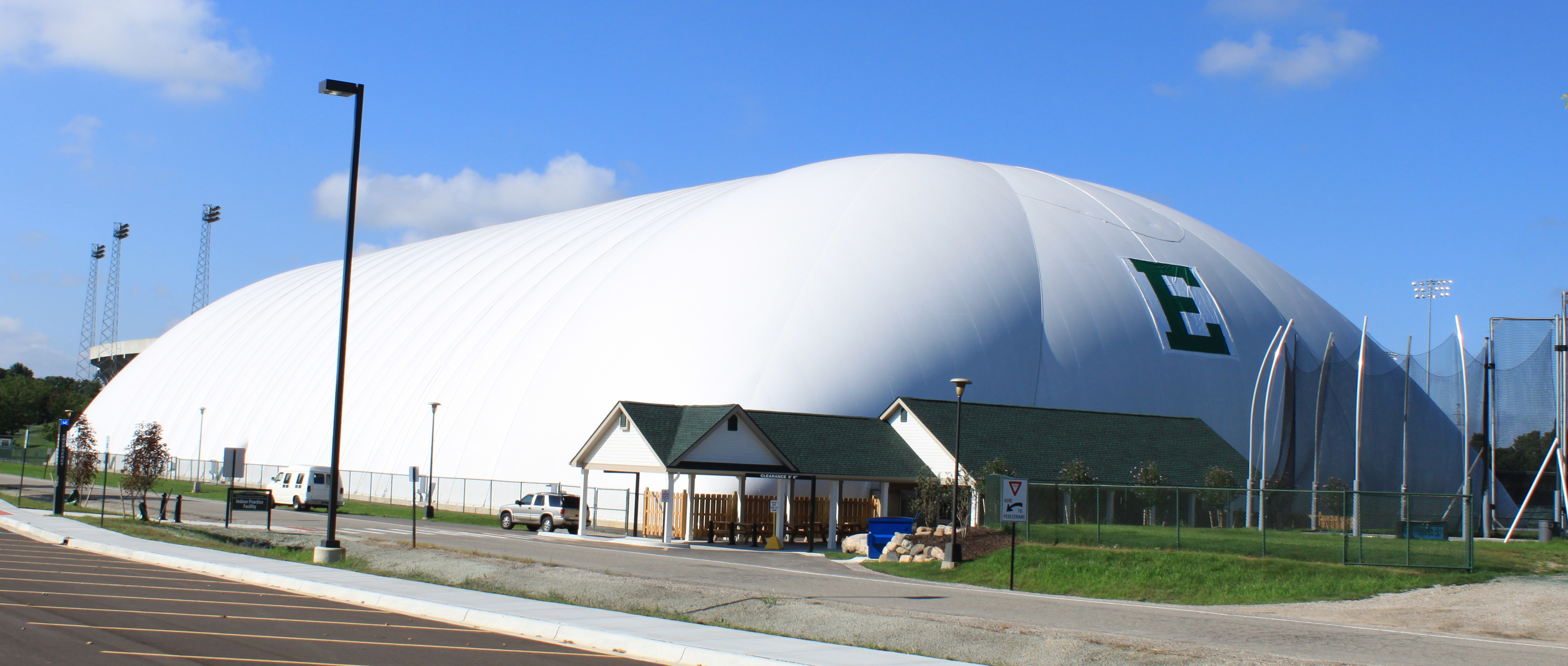
Air-supported polyester roof, Michigan, US

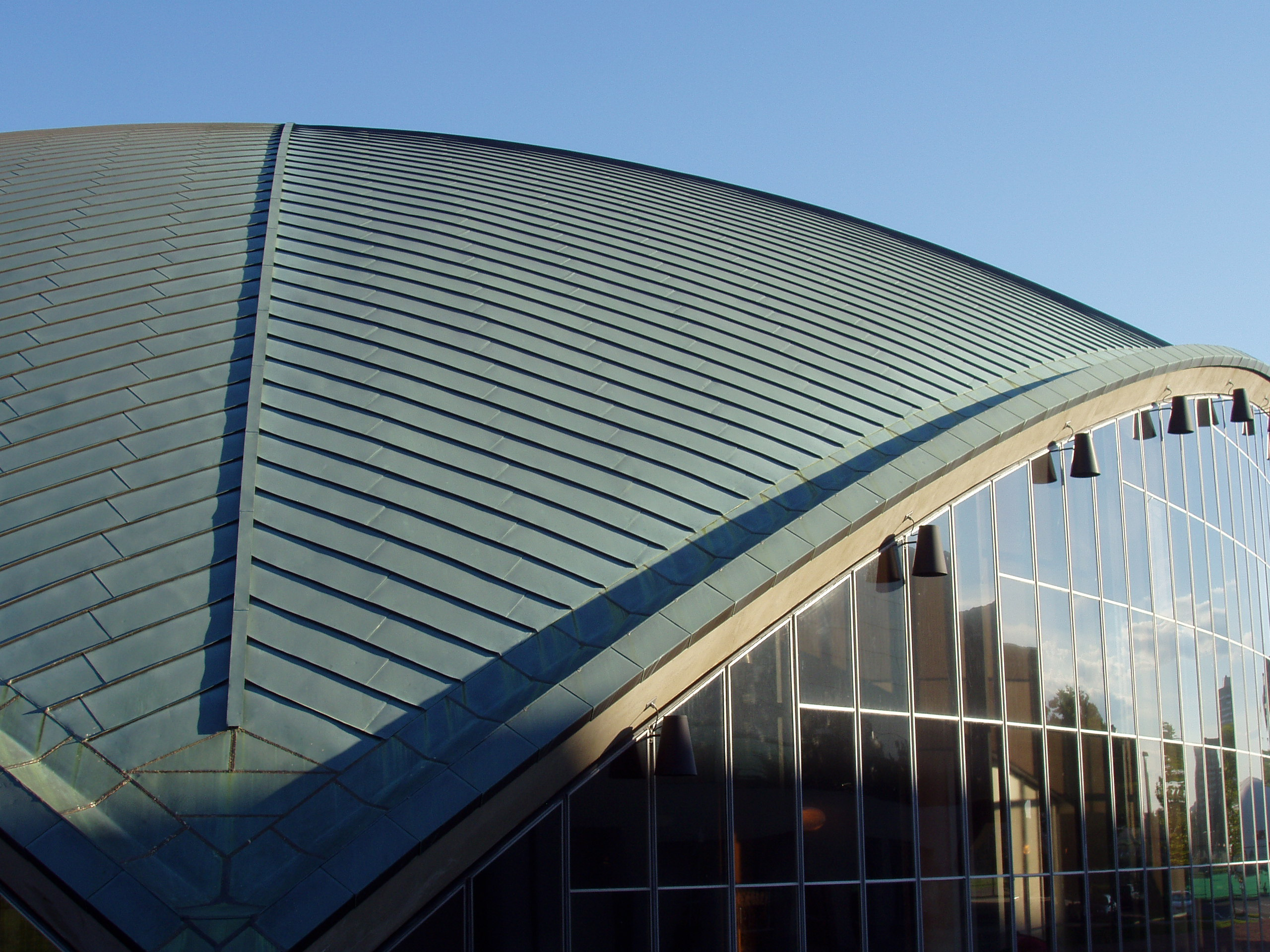
Copper clad roof, MIT, United States

== See also ==
- Roof
- Domestic roof construction
- List of roof shapes
- Board roof
- Building construction
- Building insulation
- Building envelope
- Grouted roof
- Sod roof
- Birch-bark roof
- Stone roofs such as on a clochán or trullo
- Mud roofs such as on beehive house
- Sedum a plant used in green roofs
