= Underlayment =

Underlayment may refer to:

- Underlay, a material placed underneath floor carpet, other flooring materials, or mattress bedding
- Underlayment, a water-resistant or waterproof layer used beneath many types of commercially available roofing material
  - Bituminous waterproofing, systems designed to protect residential and commercial buildings
  - SDM strength film, a kind of High Density Polyethylene (HDPE) Cross Laminated Strength Film
  - Tar paper, a heavy-duty paper used in construction
- Underlayment in road construction such as nonwoven fabric
- Underlay, a material in sewing
- Underlay, a technique in some types of surgery such as myringoplasty
- Underlay, a material in printing
