= Sarking =

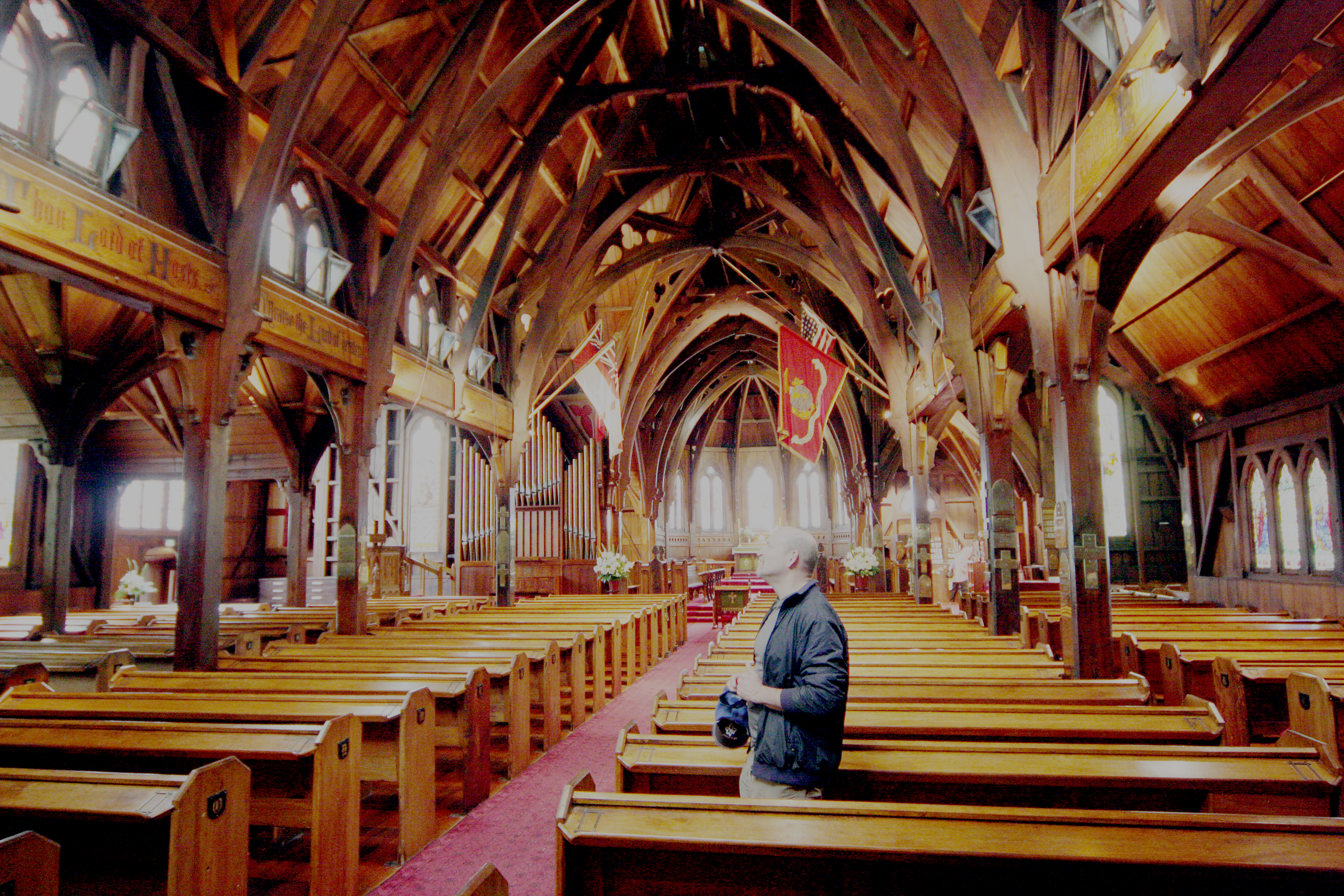
Old St Paul's, Wellington, New Zealand; the interior has been likened to the upturned hull of an Elizabethan galleon - exposed curving trusses and kauri roof sarking

Sarking is an English word with multiple meanings in roof construction:

- The use of wood panels, or "sarking boards", called sheathing, sheeting or decking in American English, under the roof-covering materials such as the shingles of a roof to provide support. It is a common term in Scotland, Australia, and New Zealand. The shingles or slates are nailed directly to the sarking boards without timber battens, providing a strong, wind-resistant roof.
- An additional layer within a roof that insulates or reflects heat, such as a layer of felt, reflective foil, or polystyrene.
- Roofing felt or other type of underlayment (Am. English) under the roof covering for extra resistance to leakage.
- The word sarking is further used as part of the term scrim and sarking, a method of interior construction widely used in Australia and New Zealand in the late 19th and early 20th centuries.
- In modern usage of the term in Australia, sarking refers to a laminated aluminium foil layer, or reflective foil laminate (RFL), that is installed on the roof trusses, beneath the battens, supporting a tile or metal deck roof. It acts as additional radiative (radiant barrier) and convective insulation and provides a condensation barrier.

In New Zealand, both corrugated metal and asbestos-cement shingle roofs were fitted directly over wooden sarking boards in the historical "bungalow" style of house construction.

== See also ==
- Scrim (material)
