= Tar paper =

Construction material

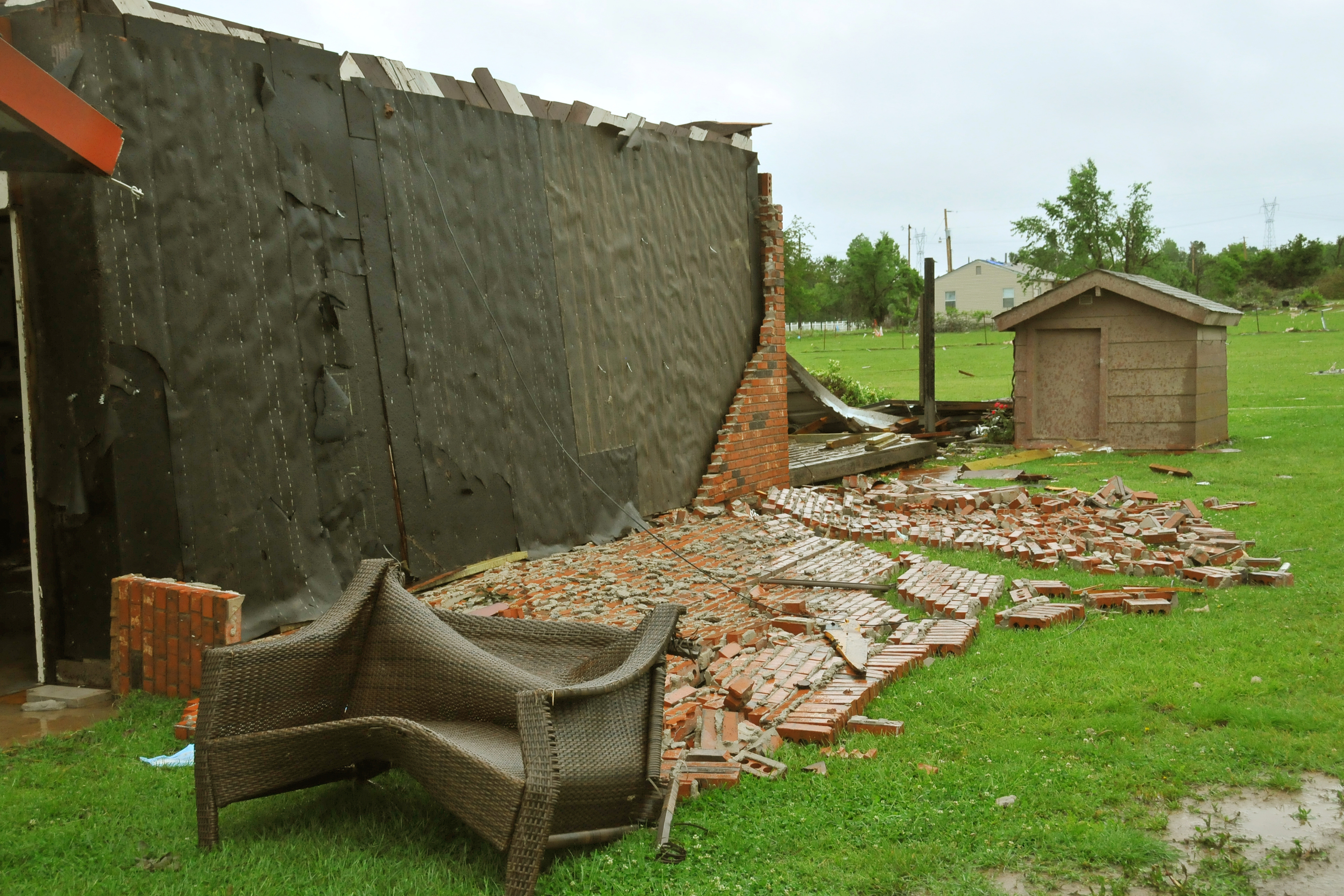
Tar paper on a wall exposed by tornado damage in Oklahoma, used as a moisture-resistant backing for a masonry veneer exterior wall

Tar paper, roofing paper, felt paper, underlayment, or roofing tar paper is a heavy-duty paper used in construction. Tar paper is made by impregnating paper with tar, producing a waterproof material useful for roof construction. Tar paper is similar to roofing felt, historically a felt-like fabric made from recycled rags impregnated with melted asphalt, and today evolving into a more complex underlayment of synthetic mesh or fiberglass strands waterproofed by synthetically enhanced asphalt.

== Description ==
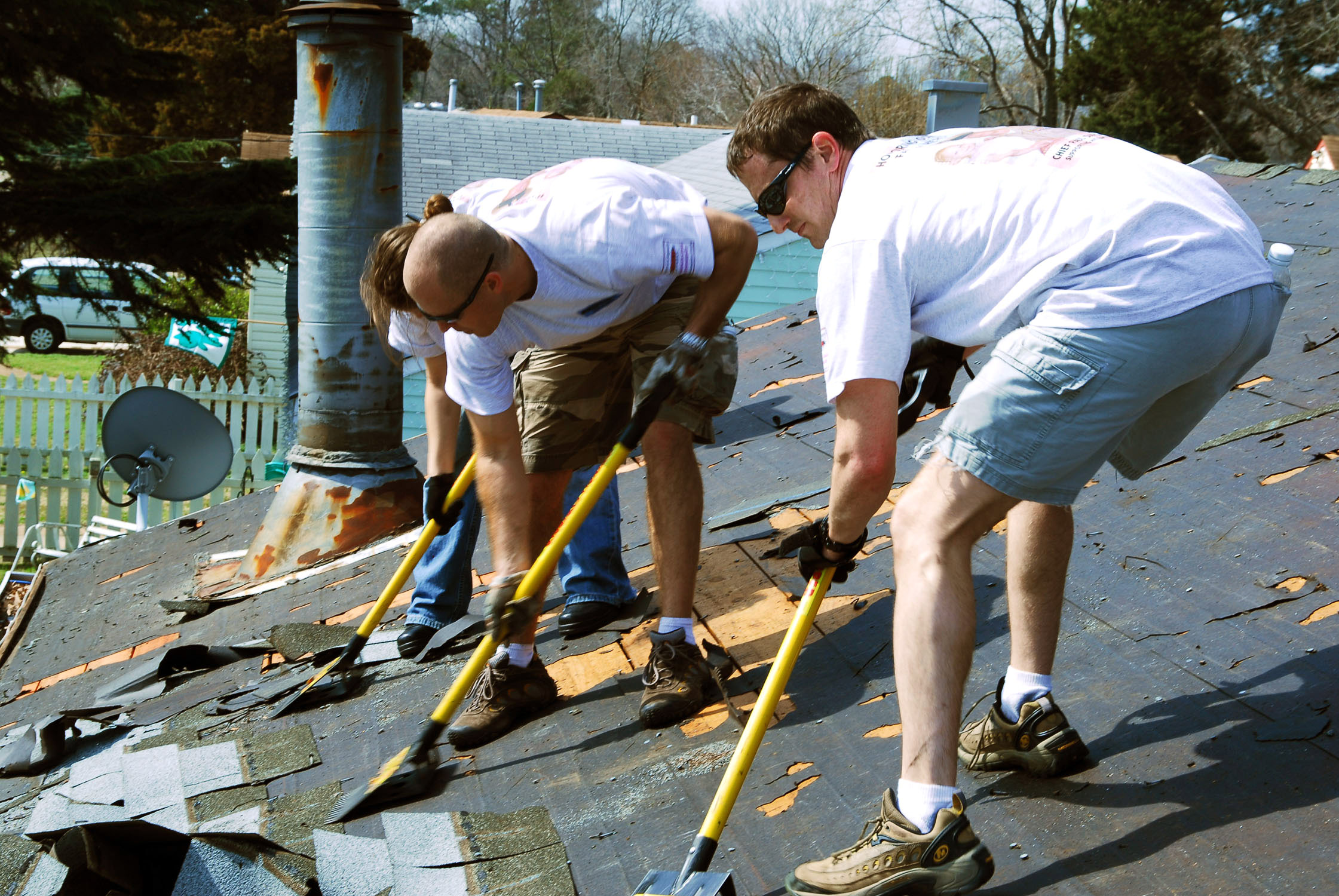
Workers using roofing shovels to remove asphalt shingles from a roof. They are standing atop a layer of what appears to be tar paper, a bitumen or asphalt impregnated waterproofing layer between the shingles and the wood roof sheathing.

Tar paper has been in use for centuries. It is defined as a Grade D building paper—a designation derived from a federal specification in the United States. Sometimes anachronistically referred to as "building paper", tar paper is manufactured from virgin kraft paper (as opposed to the fabric-based or synthetic mesh substrates of roofing felt) impregnated with asphalt. The result is a lighter-weight but less durable product with similar properties to felt.

Grade papers are rated in minutes: the amount of time it takes for a moisture-sensitive chemical indicator to change color when a small boat-like sample is floated on water. Common grades include 10-, 20-, 30-, and 60-minute. The higher the rating, the heavier and more moisture-resistant the paper. A typical 20-minute paper will weigh about 3.3 pounds (1.5 kg) per square, a 30-minute paper 3.75 pounds (1.70 kg) per square, and a 60-minute paper about 6 pounds (2.7 kg) per square. The smaller volume of material, however, does tend to make these papers less resistant to moisture than heavier felts.

== Uses ==
Tar paper is used as a roofing underlayment with asphalt, wood, shake, and other roof shingles as a form of intermediate bituminous waterproofing. It is sold in rolls of various widths, lengths, and thicknesses – 3-foot-wide (0.91 m) rolls, 50 or 100 feet (15 or 30 m) long and "15 lb" (7 kg) and "30 lb" (14 kg) weights are common in the U.S. – often marked with chalk lines at certain intervals to aid in laying it out straight on roofs with the proper overlap (more overlap for flatter roofs).

It is typically stapled in place, or held with roofing nails, and is sometimes applied in several layers with hot asphalt, cold asphalt (adhesive), or non-asphaltic adhesives.

Older construction typically used a lighter-weight tar paper, stapled up with some overlap, as a water- and wind-proofing material on walls, largely displaced in recent decades by breathable plastic housewrap, commonly in 8-or-10-foot (2.4 or 3.0 m) widths.

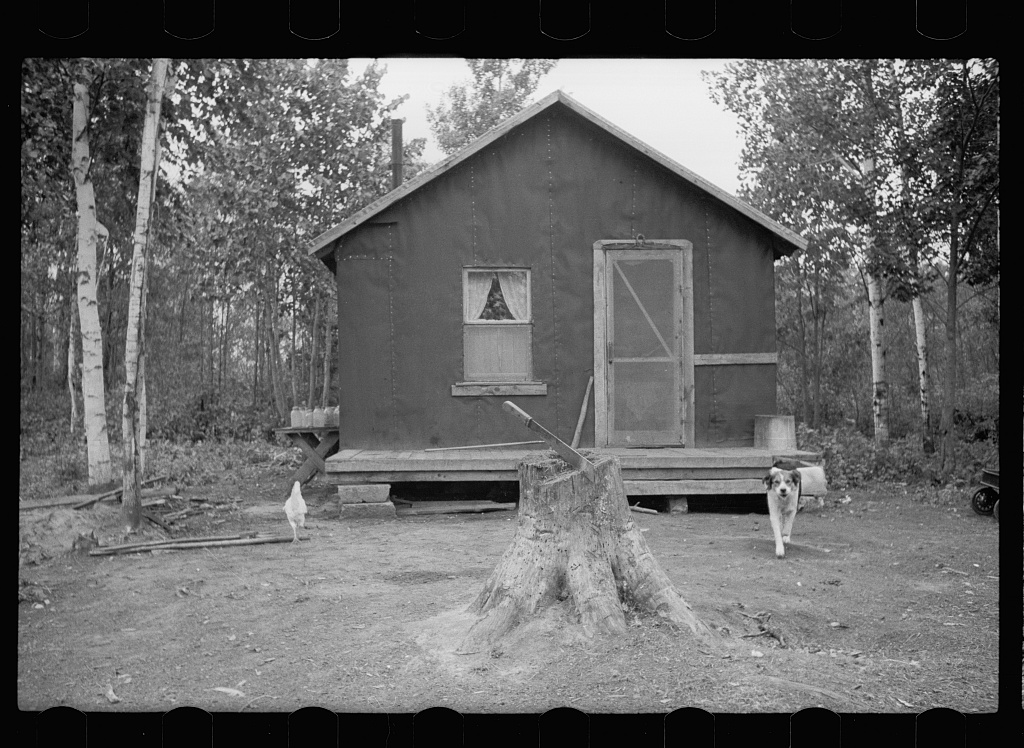
Tar paper shack in Minnesota in 1939

In the 19th and early 20th centuries, shacks of wooden frames covered with tar paper were a common form of temporary structure or very low-cost permanent housing in the rural United States and Canada, particularly in the temperate American South.
