= Scrim and sarking =

Building construction materials

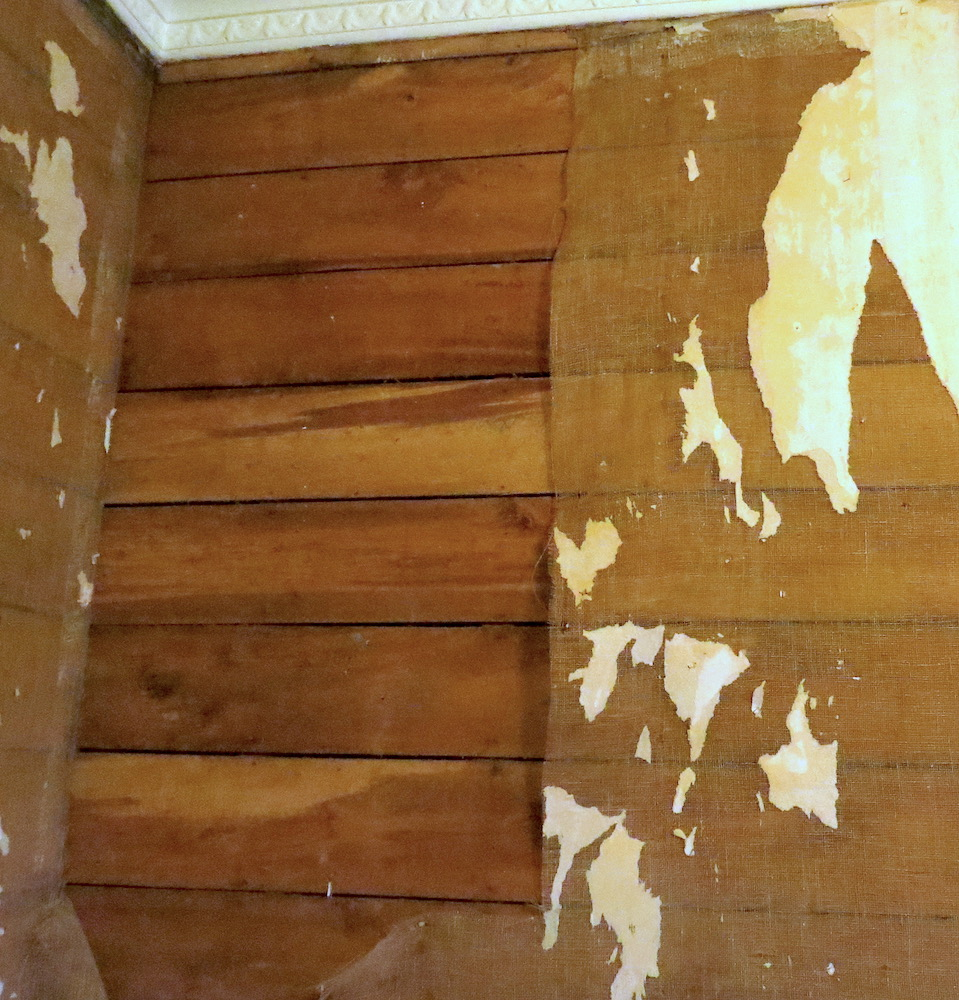
Scrim and sarking visible on a wall being renovated in Dunedin, New Zealand.

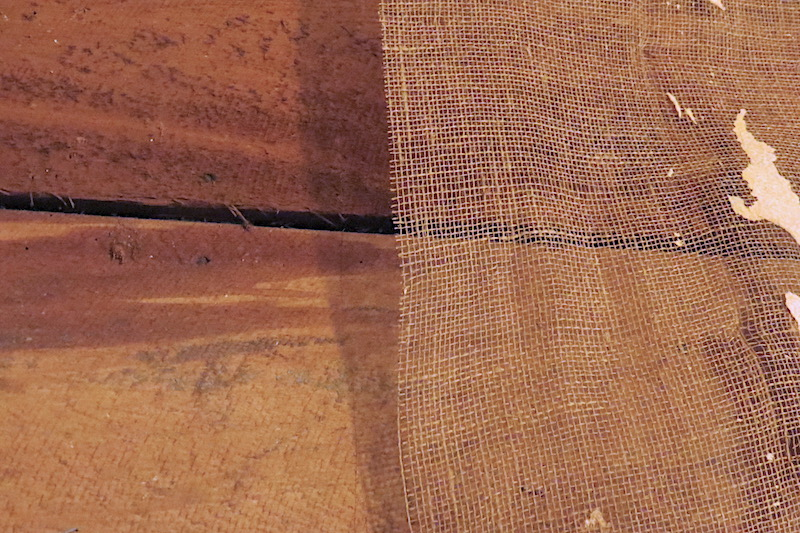
Sarking (boards) are nailed to the beams of the house, and them scrim (loose-weave material) is stapled or nailed over it.

Scrim and sarking is a method of interior construction widely used in Australia and New Zealand in the late 19th and early 20th centuries. In this method, wooden panels were nailed over the beams and joists of a house frame, and a heavy, loosely woven cloth, called scrim, was then stapled or tacked over the wood panels. This construction method allowed wallpaper to be applied directly.

In New Zealand, the sarking was often the native rimu (red pine), and the scrim was usually either jute or hessian. It is easy to tell whether walls have scrim and sarking as their basis: knocking on the wall produces the sound of the wood, and any wallpaper laid over the top has an uneven finish. In many instances, the scrim will come loose from the sarking, in which case the wallpaper will appear to float loose from the wall.

== Disuse ==
Compared with more modern forms of interior wall surfacing, scrim and sarking has poor insulation properties and can encourage damp. It is also more costly to insure homes with scrim and sarking walls, as they pose a fire danger. For these reasons, home renovation will often see it replaced with gypsum-based wallboards.
