= Birch-bark roof =

Finnish and Norwegian traditional roof construction

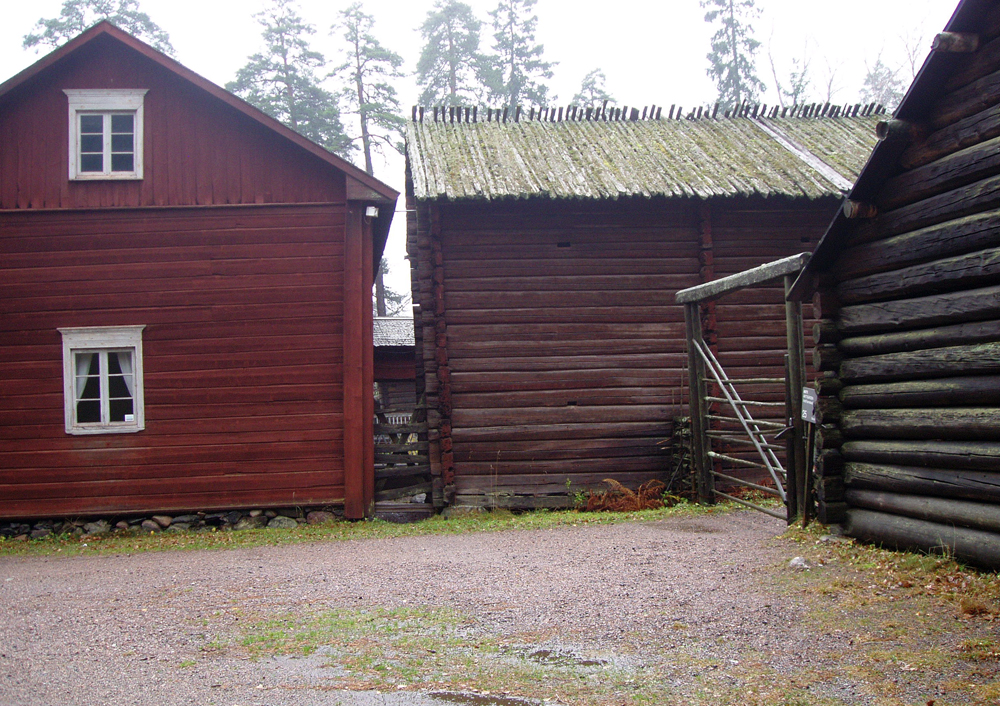
The Antti farmstead in the Seurasaari Open-Air Museum, Helsinki: timber poles form the top layer of the birch-bark roof

A birch-bark roof (in Finnish: malkakatto or tuohikatto) is a roof construction traditional in Finland and Norway for farmhouses and farm buildings built from logs.

The birch-bark roof was the prevailing roof type in rural Finland up until the 1860s, when it was replaced by the use of other materials such as metal sheeting and later roofing felt. The tradition of birch-bark roofs has been revived in recent years as a craft in connection with the restoration of old[farm buildings that have been converted into open-air museums.

== Construction ==
The birch bark itself does not form the top layer of the roof. Once the main log frame of the building is constructed, the main horizontal roof poles are laid down; after this comes thin timber slats placed at right-angles to the base roof poles. On top of these then come the layers of birch-bark, each row overlapping the next. The number of layers could vary from 2 to 6 depending on the building. On top of the birch-bark layers were then placed long heavy wooden poles (usually de-barked young trees).

The poles on either side of the pitched roof would be interlocked at the roof ridge. The poles were held in place at the eaves by an eaves board. The poles nearest the end gable would further be fixed with tree-root bindings. Furthermore, rocks were often placed on the roof to further add weight. Alternatively, though less common, turf would be placed above the birch bark.

== Benefits ==
The main reason for using birch bark was that when added in several layers, it acts as an efficient water- and damp-proof course. The birch trees would normally be de-barked, using a knife, during the summer.

== See also ==
- Sod roof
- Board roof
