= Asphalt shingle =

Type of shingle

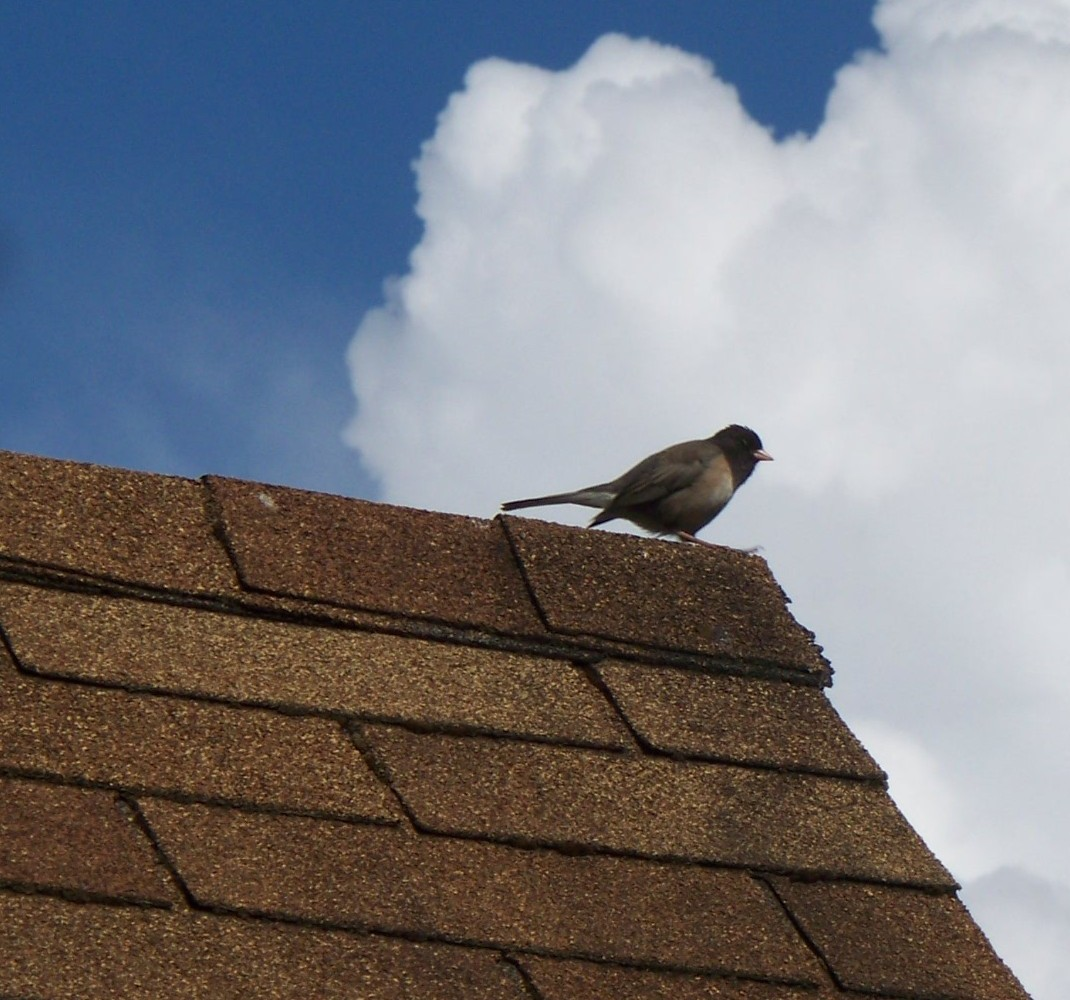
A ridge cap on a 3-tab asphalt shingle roof is composed of individual shingle "tabs" folded over the ridge and nailed partially overlapping one-another

An asphalt shingle is a type of wall or roof shingle that uses asphalt for waterproofing. It is one of the most widely used roofing covers in North America because it has a relatively inexpensive up-front cost and is fairly simple to install.

== History ==
Asphalt shingles are an American invention by Henry Reynolds of Grand Rapids, Michigan. They were first used in 1903, in general use in parts of the United States by 1911 and by 1939 11 million squares (100 million square meters) of shingles were being produced. A U.S. National Board of Fire Underwriters campaign to eliminate the use of wood shingles on roofs was a contributing factor in the growth in popularity of asphalt shingles during the 1920s. The forerunner of these shingles was first developed in 1893 and called asphalt prepared roofing, which was similar to asphalt roll roofing without the surface granules. In 1897 slate granules were added to the surface to make the material more durable. Types of granules tested have included mica, oyster shells, slate, dolomite, fly-ash, silica and clay. In 1901 this material was first cut into strips for use as one-tab and multi-tab shingles.

All shingles were organic at first with the base material, called felt, being primarily cotton rag until the 1920s when cotton rag became more expensive and alternative materials were used. Other organic materials used as the felt included wool, jute or manila, and wood pulp. In 1926 the Asphalt Shingle and Research Institute with the National Bureau of Standards tested 22 types of experimental felts and found no significant differences in performance. In the 1950s self-sealing and manually applied adhesives began to be used to help prevent wind damage to shingle roofs. The design standard was for the self-sealing strips of adhesive to be fully adhered after sixteen hours at 140 °F (60 °C). Also in the 1950s testing on the use of 3/4-inch (19 mm) staples rather than roofing nails was carried out showing they could perform as well as nails but with six staples compared with four nails. In 1960 fiberglass mat bases were introduced with limited success; the lighter, more flexible fiberglass shingles proved to be more susceptible to wind damage particularly at freezing temperatures. Later generations of shingles constructed using fiberglass in place of asbestos provided acceptable durability and fireproofing. Also in the 1960s research into hail damage found that it occurs when hail reaches a size larger than 1.5 inches (38 mm).

The Asphalt Roofing Manufacturers Association (ARMA) formed the High Wind Task Force in 1990 to continue research to improve shingle wind resistance. In 1996, a partnership between members of the U.S. property insurance industry, the Institute of Business and Home Safety, and the Underwriter's Laboratory (UL) was established to create an impact resistance classification system for roofing materials. The system, known as UL 2218, established a national standard for impact resistance. Subsequently, insurers offered discounted premiums for policies on structures using shingles that carried the highest impact classification (class 4). In 1998, Texas Insurance Commissioner Elton Bomer mandated that Texas provide premium discounts to policyholders that installed class 4 roofs.

== Types ==
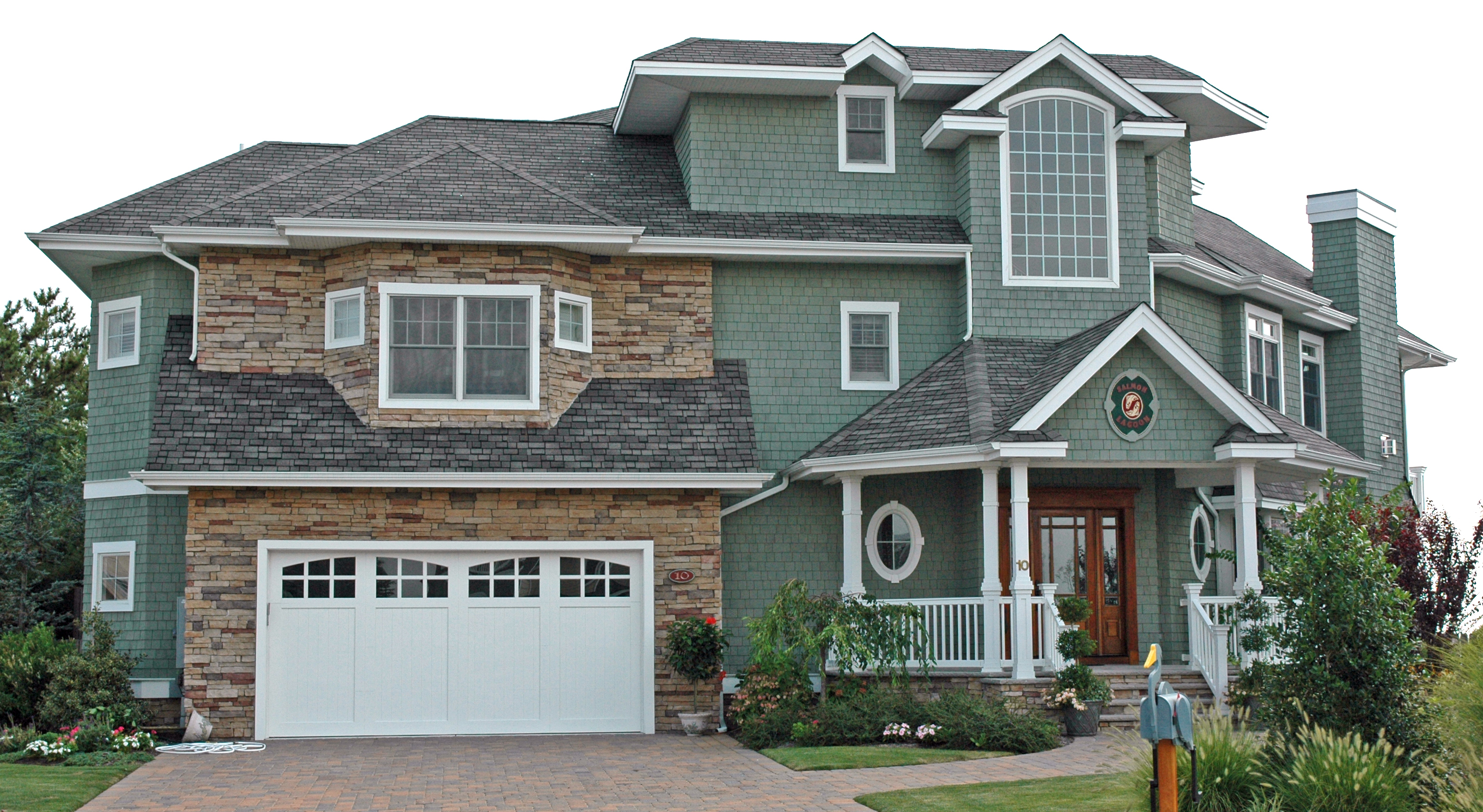
Asphalt shingles on a home in Avalon, New Jersey

Two types of base materials are used to make asphalt shingles, organic and fiberglass. Both are made in a similar manner, with an asphalt-saturated base covered on one or both sides with asphalt or modified-asphalt, the exposed surface impregnated with slate, schist, quartz, vitrified brick, stone, or ceramic granules, and the under-side treated with sand, talc or mica to prevent shingles from sticking to one-another before use.

The top surface granules block ultra-violet light, which causes the shingles to deteriorate, provides some physical protection of the asphalt core, and provides color – lighter shades preferred for their heat reflectivity in sunny climates, darker in cooler ones for their absorption. Some shingles have copper or other biocides added to the surface to help prevent algae growth. Self-sealing strips are standard on the underside of shingles to provide resistance to lifting in high winds. This material is typically limestone or fly-ash-modified resins, or polymer-modified bitumen. American Society of Civil Engineers ASTM D7158 is the standard most United States residential building codes use as their wind resistance standard for most discontinuous, steep-slope roof coverings (including asphalt shingles) with the following class ratings: Class D – Passed at basic wind speeds up to and including 90 mph (140 km/h); Class G – Passed at basic wind speeds up to and including 120 mph (190 km/h); and Class H – Passed at basic wind speeds up to and including 150 mph (240 km/h). An additive known as styrene-butadiene-styrene (SBS), sometimes called modified or rubberized asphalt, is sometimes added to the asphalt mixture to make shingles more pliable, resistant to thermal cracking, and more resistant to damage from hail impacts. Some manufacturers use a fabric backing known as a scrim on the back side of shingles to make them more impact resistant. Most insurance companies offer discounts to homeowners for using Class 4 impact rated shingles.

=== Organic ===
Organic shingles are made with a base mat of organic materials such as waste paper, cellulose, wood fiber, or other materials. This is saturated with asphalt to make it waterproof, then a top coating of adhesive asphalt is applied, covered with solid granules. Such shingles contain around 40% more asphalt per unit area than fiberglass shingles. Their organic core leaves them more prone to fire damage, resulting in a maximum class "B" FM fire rating. They are also less brittle than fiberglass shingles in cold weather.

The early wood material-based versions were very durable and hard to tear, an important quality before self-sealing materials were added to the underside of shingles to bond them to the layer beneath. Also, some organic shingles produced before the early 1980s may contain asbestos.

Almost all major asphalt shingle manufacturers stopped production of organic shingles during the mid-to-late 2000's, with Building Products of Canada being the last manufacturer to make organic shingles, finally ceasing production in 2011.

=== Fiberglass ===
Fiberglass reinforcement was devised as the replacement for asbestos in organic mat shingles. Fiberglass shingles have a base layer of glass fiber reinforcing mat made from wet, random-laid glass fibers bonded with urea-formaldehyde resin. The mat is then coated with asphalt containing mineral fillers to make it waterproof. Such shingles resist fire better than those with organic/paper mats, making them eligible for as high as a class "A" rating. Area density typically ranges from 1.8 to 2.3 pounds per square foot (8.8–11.2 kg/m^{2}).

Fiberglass shingles gradually began to replace organic felt shingles, and by 1982 overtook them in use. Widespread hurricane damage in Florida during the 1990s prompted the industry to adhere to a 1700-gram tear value on finished asphalt shingles.

Per 2003 International Building Code Sections 1507.2.1 and 1507.2.2, asphalt shingles shall only be used on roof slopes of two units vertical in 12 units horizontal (17% slope) or greater. Asphalt shingles shall be fastened to solidly sheathed decks. Shallower slopes require asphalt rolled roofing, or other roofing treatment.

=== Architectural or three-tab ===
Asphalt shingles come in two standard design options: architectural (also known as dimensional) shingles, and three-tab shingles. Three-tab are essentially flat simple shingles with a uniform shape and size. They use less material and are thinner than architectural shingles, and are therefore lighter and lower cost for both the material and the installation. They also do not last as long or offer manufacturer's warranties as long as good architectural asphalt shingles. Three-tab are still the most commonly installed in lower-value homes, such as those used as rental properties. However, they are declining in popularity in favor of the architectural style. Dimensional, or architectural shingles are thicker and stronger, vary in shape and size, and offer more aesthetic appeal; casting more distinct, random shadow lines better mimics the appearance of traditional roofing materials such as wood shake shingles. The result is a more natural, traditional look. While more expensive to install, they come with longer manufacturer's warranties, sometimes up to 50 years - typically prorated, as virtually all asphalt shingle roofs are replaced before such an expiration could be reached. While three-tab shingles typically need to be replaced after 15–18 years, Dimensional typically last 24–30 years.

== Qualities ==
Asphalt shingles have varying qualities which help them survive wind, hail, or fire damage and discoloration.

- The American Society of Testing Materials (ASTM) has developed specifications for roof shingles: ASTM D 225-86 (Asphalt Shingles (Organic Felt) Surfaced with Mineral Granules) and ASTM D3462-87 (Asphalt Shingles Made from Glass Felt and Surfaced with Mineral Granules), ASTM D3161, Standard Test Method for Wind-Resistance of Asphalt Shingles (2005),
- Many shapes and textures of asphalt shingles are available: 3-tab, jet, "signature cut", Art-Loc, t-lock, tie lock, etc. Architectural (laminated) shingles are a multi-layer, laminated shingle which gives more varied, contoured visual effect to a roof surface and add more resistance for water. These shingles are designed to avoid repetitive patterns in the shingle appearance. Hip and ridge lines can have standard three-tab shingles cut to fit. Manufacturers also make specialized shingles for these areas. Starter shingles are also required and, because they are not visible after installation is complete, the use of extra shingles (commonly referred to as 'waste') are used here. However, manufacturers also make a specialized starter row shingle. The use of specialized ridge/hip shingles and the use of specialized starter row shingles, results in decreased labor expenses in exchange for an increase in material cost. Laminated shingles are heavier and more durable than traditional three-tab shingle designs.
- Solar reflecting shingles help reduce air conditioning costs in hot climates by being a better reflective surface.
- Wind damage: Asphalt shingles come in varying resistance to wind damage. Shingles with the highest fastener pull through resistance, bond strength of the self-seal adhesive, properly nailed will resist wind damage the best. Extra precautions can be taken in high wind areas to fasten a durable underlayment and/or seal the plywood seams in the event the shingles are blown off. UL 997 Wind Resistance of Prepared Roof Covering Materials class 1 is best Wind Resistance roof standard and ASTM D 3161 class F is best for bond strength.
- Hail damage: Hail storms can damage asphalt shingles. For impact resistance UL 2218 Class 4 is best. This increases survivability from hailstorms, but the shingles become more susceptible to hail damage with age.
- Fire resistance: Forest fires and other exterior fires risk roofs catching on fire. Fiberglass shingles have a better, class A, flame spread rating based on UL 790, and ASTM E 108 testing. Organic shingles have a class C rating.
- Algae resistance Algae is not believed to damage asphalt shingles but it may be objectionable aesthetically. Different treatment methods are used to prevent discoloration from algae growth on the roof. Moss feeds on algae and any other debris on the roof. Some manufactures offer a 5- to 10-year warranty against algae growth on their algae resistant shingles.
- Locking shingles: Special asphalt shingles are designed to lock together called tie lock or T lock.
- Durability Shingle durability is ranked by warranted life, ranging from 20 years to lifetime warranties are available. However, a stated warranty is not a guarantee of durability. A shingle manufacturer's warranty may pro-rate repair costs, cover materials only, have different warranty periods for different types of damage, and transfer to another owner.

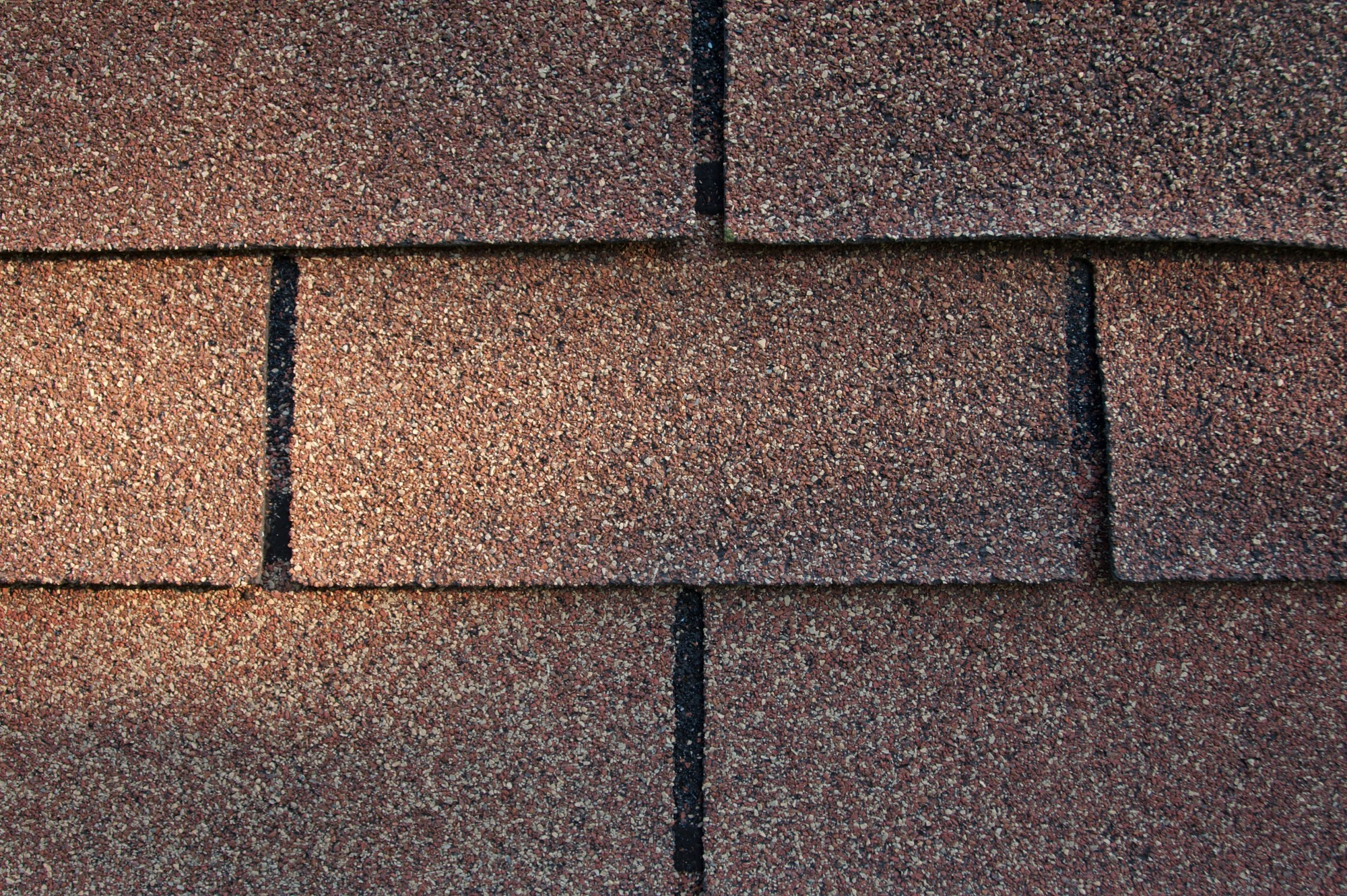
Three-tab asphalt shingle roofing in good condition

Shingles tend to last longer where the weather stays consistent, either consistently warm, or consistently cool. Thermal shock can damage shingles, when the ambient temperature changes dramatically within a very short period of time. "Experiments...have noted that the greatest cause of asphalt shingle aging is thermal loading." Over time the asphalt becomes oxidized and becomes brittle. Roof orientation and ventilation can extend the service life of a roof by reducing temperatures. Shingles should not be applied when temperatures are below 10 °C (50 °F), as each shingle must seal to the layer below it to form a monolithic structure. The underlying exposed asphalt must be softened by sunlight and heat to form a proper bond.

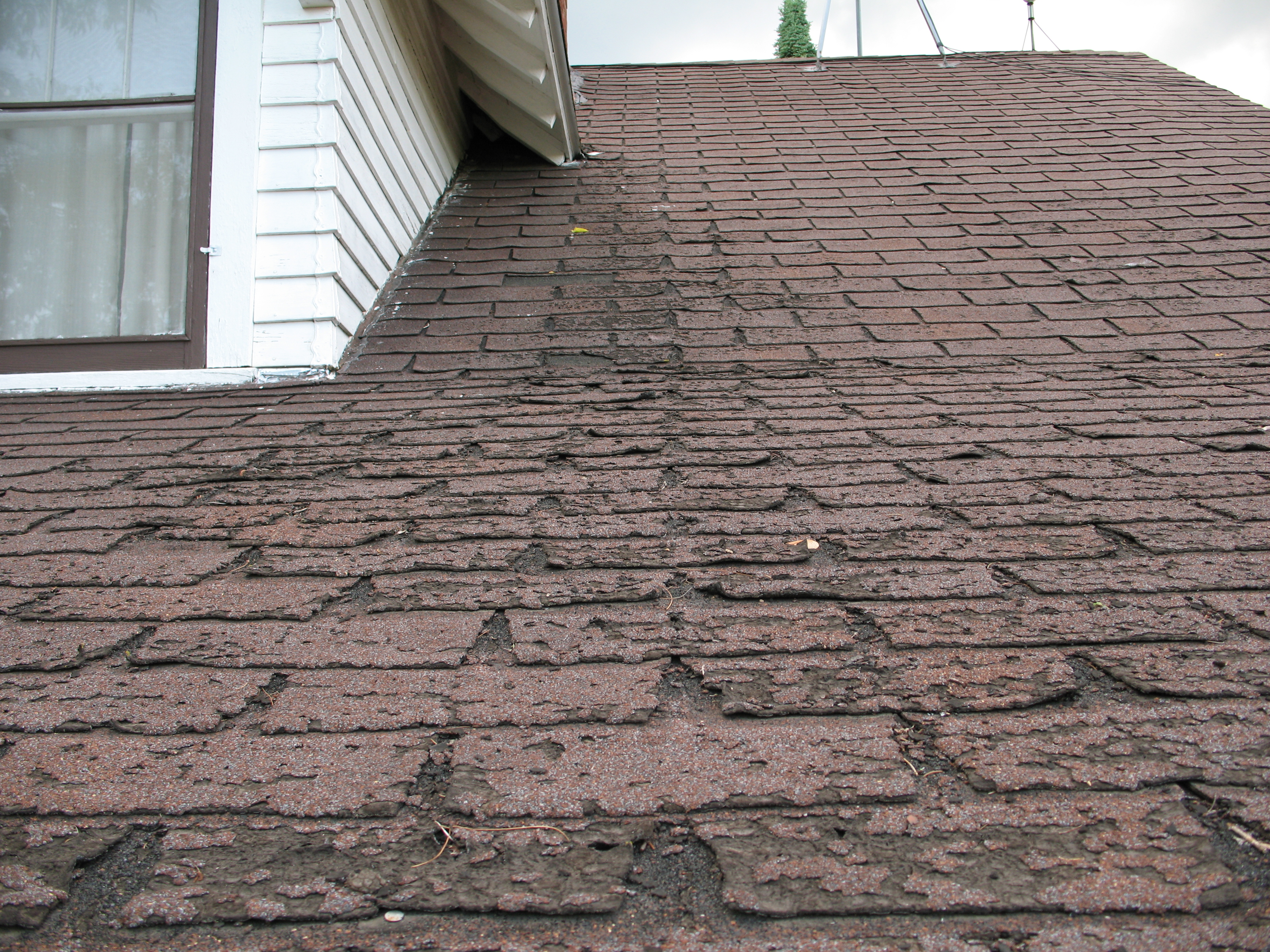

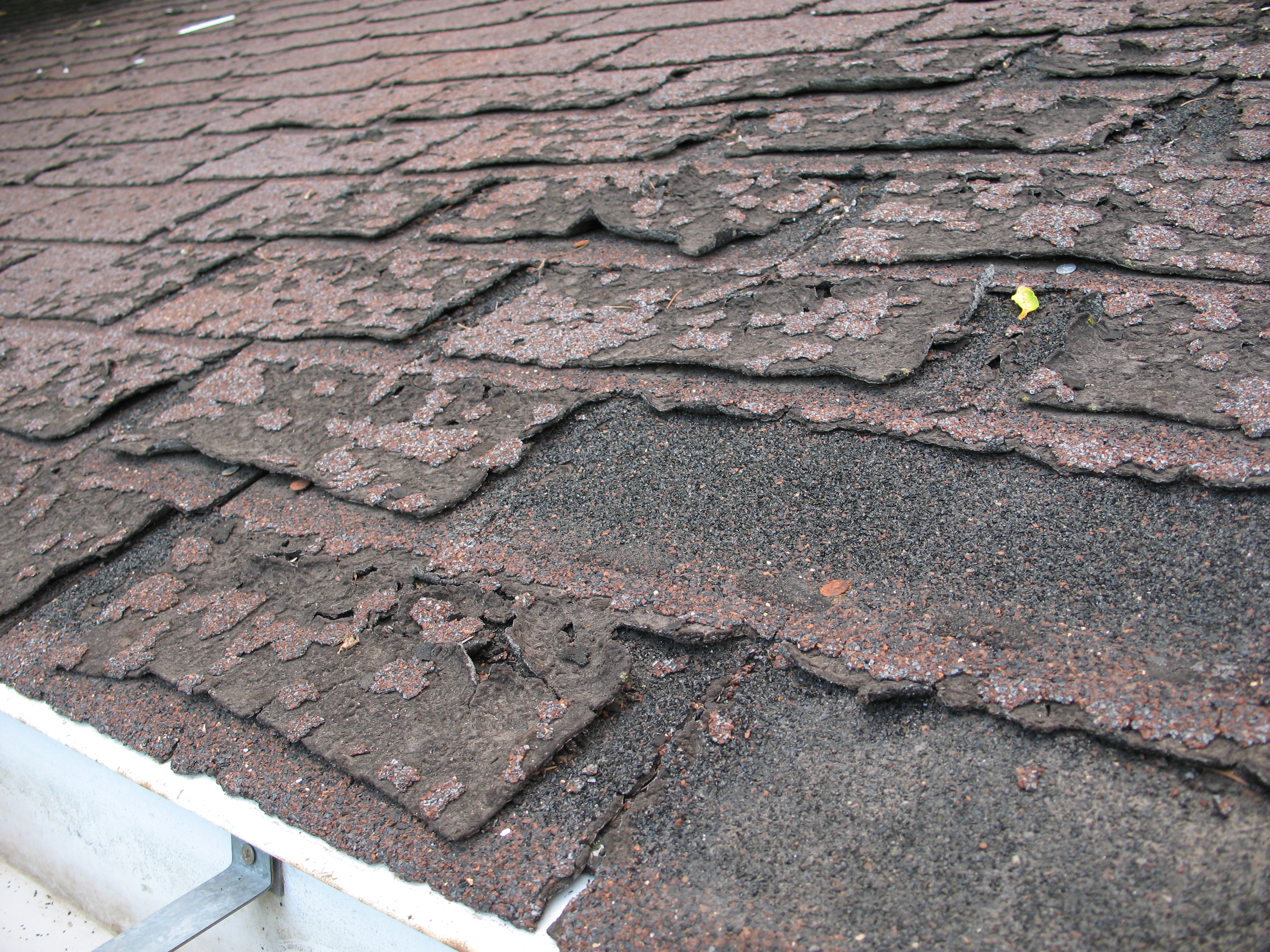

Left: Example of faster asphalt shingle wear along eaves due to channeled water running down the roof. Right: Severe shrinkage resulting in tearing away of entire flaps. Water running down the roof can seep around the exposed nails into the interior space.

The protective nature of asphalt shingles primarily comes from the long-chain hydrocarbons impregnating the paper. Over time in the hot sun, the hydrocarbons soften and when rain falls the hydrocarbons are gradually washed out of the shingles and down onto the ground. Along eaves and complex rooflines more water is channeled so in these areas the loss occurs more quickly. Eventually the loss of the heavy oils causes the fibers to shrink, exposing the nail heads under the shingle flaps. The shrinkage also breaks up the surface coating of sand adhered to the surface of the paper, and eventually causes the paper to begin to tear itself apart. Once the nail heads are exposed, water running down the roof can seep into the building around the nail shank, resulting in rotting of roof building materials and causing moisture damage to ceilings and paint inside.

== Maintenance ==
Cycles of wet and dry environmental conditions, as well as organic growths such as algae and foliose lichen and woody debris which remains on the shingles, will cause premature deterioration through both chemical and physical processes. Performed regularly, physical removal of debris, and physical or chemical removal of organic growth (for example, using a copper sulfate, zinc chloride, or other solution carefully applied and thoroughly rinsed), can prolong the life of asphalt roofing materials. Algae and moss growth may be prevented through installation of zinc or copper strips or wire at the ridge and every four to six feet down the roof; black algae growth can be removed with a bleach solution.

== Disposal and recycling ==
=== Disposal methods ===
According to a 2007 study conducted for the United States Environmental Protection Agency (EPA), approximately 11 million short tons (10.0 Mt) of asphalt shingle waste is generated each year in the United States, with the most common disposal method being landfilling. Waste asphalt shingles, however, can be recycled.

=== Recycling ===
Reclaimed asphalt shingles (RAS) can be broken down and incorporated into asphalt concrete mixtures, which are used to form pavements and road surfaces. RAS are an attractive component in recycled asphalt mixes, primarily due to their relatively high content of asphalt cement, which acts as the binding element in asphalt concrete.

There are two forms of RAS: post-manufacturer shingles that are reclaimed from factory waste, and post-consumer shingles that are reclaimed at the end of their service life (also referred to as “tear-offs”). The majority of asphalt shingle waste is post-consumer. Post-consumer RAS have fewer appealing properties for recycling, primarily because the asphalt cement component in shingles naturally hardens during its service life, resulting in higher stiffness, melting point, and susceptibility to fatigue cracking. Post-consumer RAS also require additional processing, such as the removal of nails and other metal waste through the use of a magnetic sieve.

Recycled asphalt mixtures may contain post-manufacture and/or post-consumer RAS, provided that the quality of the asphalt cement binder is accessed and accounted for. Aged binders are typically combined with soft virgin asphalt binder and/or rejuvenating additives to produce a binder that is workable and resistant to fatigue cracking. Standard practice for accessing the binder quality in RAS and blending it with virgin binder has been established by The American Association of State Highway and Transportation Officials (AASHTO). When RAS binder is combined with low-grade virgin binder, it has been demonstrated to provide some beneficial properties, such as increased resistance to rutting.

In 2019, an estimated 1.1 million tons of RAS were accepted by asphalt plants. Of those accepted, approximately 423 thousand tons were pre-processed, 334 thousand tons were unprocessed post-manufacturer shingles, and 277 thousand tons were unprocessed post-consumer shingles.

=== Health and safety concerns ===
The use of RAS in recycled asphalt mixes is entirely prohibited in 10 states, and the majority of states that allow the use of RAS restrict it to certain sectors and pavement types. The primary reason restrictions on the use of RAS exist is the rare presence of asbestos in asphalt shingles manufactured before the early 1980s. Although the lifespan of a typical asphalt shingled roof is approximately 25 years, concerns remain due to the practice of layering newly installed shingles on top of old ones.

In addition to shingles, asbestos has also been found present in felt paper, roll roofing, roof paints/coatings, caulking, and mastic, all of which may be present in the post-consumer shingle waste accepted by asphalt plants. Still, testing has demonstrated the percentage of asbestos-containing post-consumer shingles to be low. A 2007 survey of over 27,000 samples tested at 9 different facilities detected asbestos in less than 1.6% of samples.

The National Asphalt Pavement Association continues to recommend that all post-consumer RAS be inspected for asbestos and that all recycling operations have an asbestos management plan in place.

Asphalt also naturally contains polycyclic aromatic hydrocarbons (PAHs) which may leach out of RAS stockpiles or be emitted when RAS are heated. Some PAHs are carcinogenic and may put workers at risk. The recycling of RAS may lead to PAH emissions, however, there is no evidence to show that PAH emissions are lower when virgin asphalt is used in place of RAS.

== See also ==
- Metal roof
