= Stone-coated metal roofing =

A stone coated metal roof is a roof made from steel or some other metal; the metal is then coated with stone chips and attached to the steel with an acrylic film. The goal is a more durable roof that still retains the aesthetic advantages of a more traditional roofing material

== History ==
Stone coated metal roofing was refined during and after World War II in the United Kingdom, when the government requested materials that would protect corrugated steel roofs from the harsh climate. A coating of bitumen and subsequent covering by sand, stone or other materials proved effective at protecting the metal roofs and serving as camouflage against potential attack.

In 1954, L.J. Fisher, an industrialist from New Zealand, secured the rights to produce stone-coated metal roofing outside Great Britain. The company he founded, AHI Roofing, operates the largest metal roofing factory in the world, and has continued to make changes to the metal roofing product.

== See also ==
- Vinyl roof membrane
