= SDM strength film =

SDM Strength Film known by the processing names Cross-Laminated Films and Strength Films, is a kind of High Density Polyethylene (HDPE) Cross Laminated Strength Film. Because of proprietary cross-laminated process, SDM Strength Film is very strong and find many application.

== Conception of SDM ==
The SDM means Spiral cut, Double-laminated and Machine direction drawing.
It is the processing name for this kind of films.

== Structure ==
There is only one molecular orientation for the normal HDPE films. So, along this direction, HDPE films have a bigger tensile strength, but weak properties in the other direction.

Second drew by +45° Second drew by -45° Cross Laminated
SDM Strength Film is laminated film by ±45°two second drew films. So in every direction of the films, there are strong properties.

== Manufacturing Method ==
The whole process of producing SDM Strength Films consists of some steps: they are film making, spiral cutting and cross laminated. HDPE as raw material, and blow to be a film with certain thickness by film blowing machine. In order to make the film with maximum molecular orientation in the machine direction, some additional production processes are required to make the film higher mechanical characteristics in machine direction.
And then, the spiral cutting machine cut into sheet film by 45°angle with the original machine direction.

The last, coated special glue on the surface of film and cross laminate double-layer in 90°orientation by high-pressure.

== Characteristics & Features ==
By the processes of film-blowing, and second drawing, the films molecules are rearranged, so that make the film more synclastic molecular arrangement, and more tensile strength accordingly. And the processing of spiral cutting and double-layer-cross laminating(+ - 45°), make the tensile strength in two direction distributed more equality in all direction.
Those processes modified the molecular arrangement and physical structure, and make the SDM Strength Film good tensile and tearing strength, and puncture and weather resistant, thermal dimensional stability and cryogenic flexibility, and difficult to tear as well as break.

== Application ==
Civil Engineering & Waterproofing
The major applications of SDM Strength Film are the production of waterproof membrane, roof underlayment, air/vapor barrier and other carrier film for the tapes;
These waterproof membrane, tapes are produced by coating modified bitumen or adhesive on the carrier film (SDM Strength Film).
Printing Label/Tag
In the label industry, because of the properties of SDM Strength Film, SDM Strength Film can be used RFID labels, rebar & steel tags, lumber tags, brick tags, cargo tags, banner and sign, etc.
Packaging
SDM Strength Film can be used as packing for explosive, timber, mechanical parts, chemicals and textile.
