= Bituminous waterproofing =

Roll roofing and waterproofing material

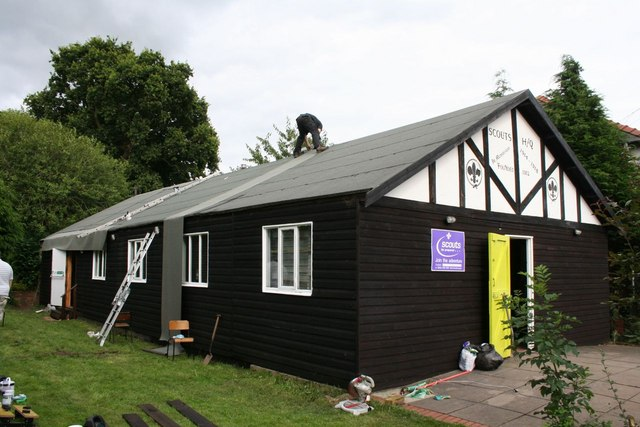
Replacing the roofing felt on a Scout hall in Wales

Bituminous waterproofing systems are designed to protect residential and commercial buildings. Bitumen (asphalt or coal-tar pitch) is a material made up of organic liquids that are highly sticky, viscous, and waterproof. Systems incorporating bituminous-based substrates are sometimes used to construct roofs, in the form of "roofing felt" or "roll roofing" products.

== Roofing felt ==
Roofing felt (similar to and often confused with tar paper, but historically made from recycled rags rather than heavy kraft paper) has been used for decades as waterproof coverings in residential and commercial roofs as an underlay(ment) (sarking) beneath other building materials, particularly roofing and siding materials, and is one type of membrane used in asphalt built up roofing (BUR) systems. Over time the felt's natural mesh used as a substrate for asphalt impregnation (derived from fabrics like cotton or burlap) has evolved into synthetic products performing the same function with improved durability. Other changes with time have enhanced performance, with roofing felt remaining a heavier and more durable product than tar paper.

=== Function ===
The rapid application of waterproof or water-resistant roofing underlay protects the roof deck during construction until the roofing material is applied. It is required for roofs required to meet Underwriters Laboratory (UL) fire ratings. The separation of the roof covering from the roof deck protects the roof covering from resins in some sheathing materials and cushions unevenness and old nails and splinters in re-roofing applications. The underlayment also sheds any water which penetrates the roof covering from an ordinary leak, a leak from wind-driven rain or snow, wind damage to the roof covering, or ice dams. However, the application of underlays may increase the roof temperature, which is the leading cause of ageing of asphalt shingles. Not installing an underlay may void the roof covering warranty.

=== Weights and grades ===
Felt paper is available in several grades, the most common being Type 1—commonly called 15-pound (15#) or No. 15 (#15)—and Type 2—commonly called 30-pound (30#) or No. 30 (#30). The weight designations originated with organic base felt weighing 15 or 30 pounds per 100 sq. ft. (0.73 or 1.46 kg per m^{2}). However, modern base felts are made of lighter-weight fibre, so the weight designations, though common colloquially, are no longer literally accurate. A heavier class of materials with a similar construction but designed for civil engineering, environmental protection, and mining applications are known as Bituminous Geomembranes (BGMs). BGMs are distinguished in part by larger roll widths which can exceed 5 m and substantial thickness of up to 6.0 mm.

Another basic designation is organic or inorganic. Organic felt paper has a base material made with formerly living materials such as rag fibre, hessian (burlap), or cellulose fibres (wood, or jute). Organic felt papers are now considered obsolete, having dwindled to just 5% of the United States market by 1987. Inorganic base products are polyester, glass fibre developed in the 1950s, and historically, asbestos mat. Polyester mat is weaker and less chemically stable than fibreglass, but because it is cheap it has gained market share. Polyester mat is primarily used with the more flexible modified-bitumen felt products. Asbestos mat was the first inorganic base material, but was outlawed in the 1980s for health reasons; however it is still in use on some buildings. Inorganic felts are lighter, more tear-resistant, more fire-resistant, and do not absorb water. Another type of felt paper is perforated for use in built-up roofing and is not for use as a water-resistant underlay.

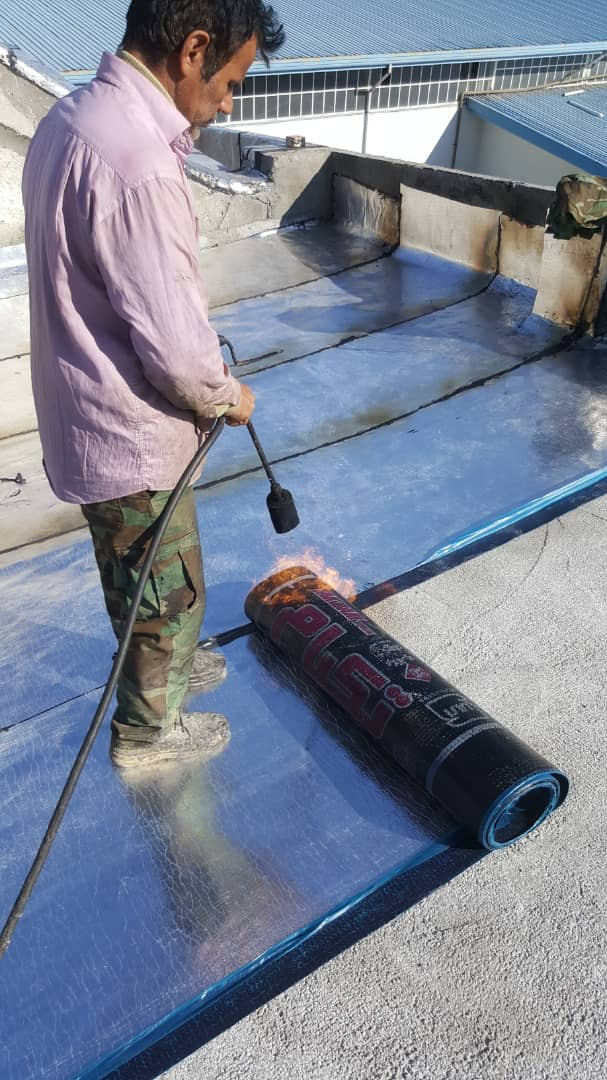
Torch-on bitumen-based waterproofing membrane being rolled out. Tehran Iran

Heavier material is typically used for underlayment of longer-lived roof materials in order to match their longer life span, and on less sloped roofs, which are more susceptible to leaking. For example, two layers of No. 30 felt might be used under a slate or tile roof, whereas a single layer of No. 15 might be adequate for a steeply raked roof of 24-year asphalt shingles.

=== Manufacturing process ===
Roofing felt is manufactured in roll format. Rolls of base felt are pulled on rollers through large tanks of bitumen mixes until they are saturated with the tar-like bitumen mixture, producing rolls of water-resistant but breathable material.

Modified bitumen is mixed with filler components such as limestone, sand, or polymers such as atactic polypropylene (APP) that gives rigidity and tear resistance or styrene-butadiene styrene (SBS), a rubber additive that gives more elastic benefits.

=== Felt paper standards ===
The American Society for Testing Materials (ASTM) standards that apply to felt paper are:

- ASTM D226 / D226M Standard — 09: Specification for Asphalt-Saturated Organic Felt Used in Roofing and Waterproofing.
  - Type I - #15 or 15 lb. perforated or non-perforated
  - Type II - #30 or 30 lb. perforated or non-perforated
- ASTM D4869 / D4869M Standard — Specification for Asphalt-Saturated Organic Felt Underlayment Used in Steep Slope Roofing. ASTM 4869-03 now includes the non-perforated felt referred to in ASTM D226-97a which will be phased out. ASTM 4869-03 includes a liquid-water transmission test (shower test) and dimensional stability limits (wrinkling) which ASTM D226-97a does not include.
  - Type 1 - #8. Formerly ASTM D4869-93 Type I
  - Type 2 - #13. Formerly ASTM D226-97a Type I (No. 15)
  - Type 3 - #20. Formerly ASTM D4869-93 Type II
  - Type 4 - #26. Formerly ASTM D226-97a Type II (No. 30)
- ASTM D2178 / D2178M-15a Standard — Specification for Asphalt Glass Felt Used in Roofing and Waterproofing.
  - Type IV has a 44-pound breaking strength
  - Type VI has a 66-pound breaking strength
- ASTM D6757 / D6757M-16a Standard — Specification for Underlayment Felt Containing Inorganic Fibres Used in Steep-Slope Roofing.
- ASTM D6222 / D6222M-16 Standard — Specification for Atactic Polypropylene (APP) Modified Bituminous Sheet Materials Using Polyester Reinforcements.
  - Type 1
  - Type 2
  - Grade G, surface coated granules
  - Grade S, smooth surface (uncoated)

The Canadian Standards Association standards are:

- CSA A123.3 Asphalt Saturated Organic Roofing Felt

== Roll roofing components ==
Roll roofing is a bitumen product similar to asphalt shingles meant for direct exposure to the weather. To protect its asphaltic base from ultraviolet degradation mineral granules are added on top of the felt, also decreasing the product's fire vulnerability. Thin, removable transparent film is added to the base of rolled roofing during manufacturing on all torch-on products. This stops the felt from sticking to the mineral layer when rolled up during the packaging process. A similar removable membrane on self-adhesive rolled roofing separates the adhesive from the mineral layer. Torch-on roofing felt also receives a removable membrane to keep it from sticking to itself prior to application.

== Irritants ==
The complex chemical composition of bitumen makes it difficult to identify the specific component(s) responsible for adverse health effects observed in exposed workers. Known carcinogens have been found in bitumen fumes generated at work sites. Observations of acute irritation in workers from airborne and dermal exposures to fumes and aerosols and the potential for chronic health effects, including cancer, warrant continued diligence in the control of exposures.

== Reasons to use a roofing underlayment ==
- It protects the roof deck from rain before the roofing is installed.
- It provides an extra weather barrier in case of blow offs or water penetration through the roofing or flashings.
- It protects the roofing from any resins that bleed out of the sheathing.
- It helps prevent unevenness in the roof sheathing from telegraphing through the shingles.
- It is usually required for the UL fire rating to apply (since shingles are usually tested with underlayment).

== Negative aspects ==
- Bitumen is mostly produced from crude oil and is not regarded as a sustainable building product
- Bitumen is combustible
- Exposure to extreme heat and UV radiation drastically decreases the lifespan
- The fumes that are produced during hot application of asphalt or tar can cause dermal and respiratory problems
- Some felt paper installed on existing buildings may contain asbestos, which has a carcinogenic risk if its dust is inhaled.

== Malthoid ==
From 1905 to 1988, The Paraffine Paint Co. of San Francisco had Malthoid as a trademark for waterproof and weatherproof building and roofing materials made of paper and felt in whole or in part. However, it had become well known before that. About 1913, Paraffine promoted its Malthoid roofing materials with a 16-page booklet. In 1941, the Duroid Company began making Malthoid in Onehunga, New Zealand.

Malthoid was once common enough to be used as a generic description of flat roofing material in New Zealand and South Africa (item 26). A description of a New Zealand house built about 1914 says it was, "built of timber framework. covered by sheets of asbestos. The roof was closely timbered, then covered by strips of Malthoid paper. This was then painted with tar and topped off with a sprinkling of sand." Railway vehicles in Australia were roofed with Malthoid. Malthoid is still available for flat roofs and damp courses.

== See also ==
- Butyl rubber
- Vinyl roof membrane
