= Scrim (material) =

Woven material used in theatre and construction

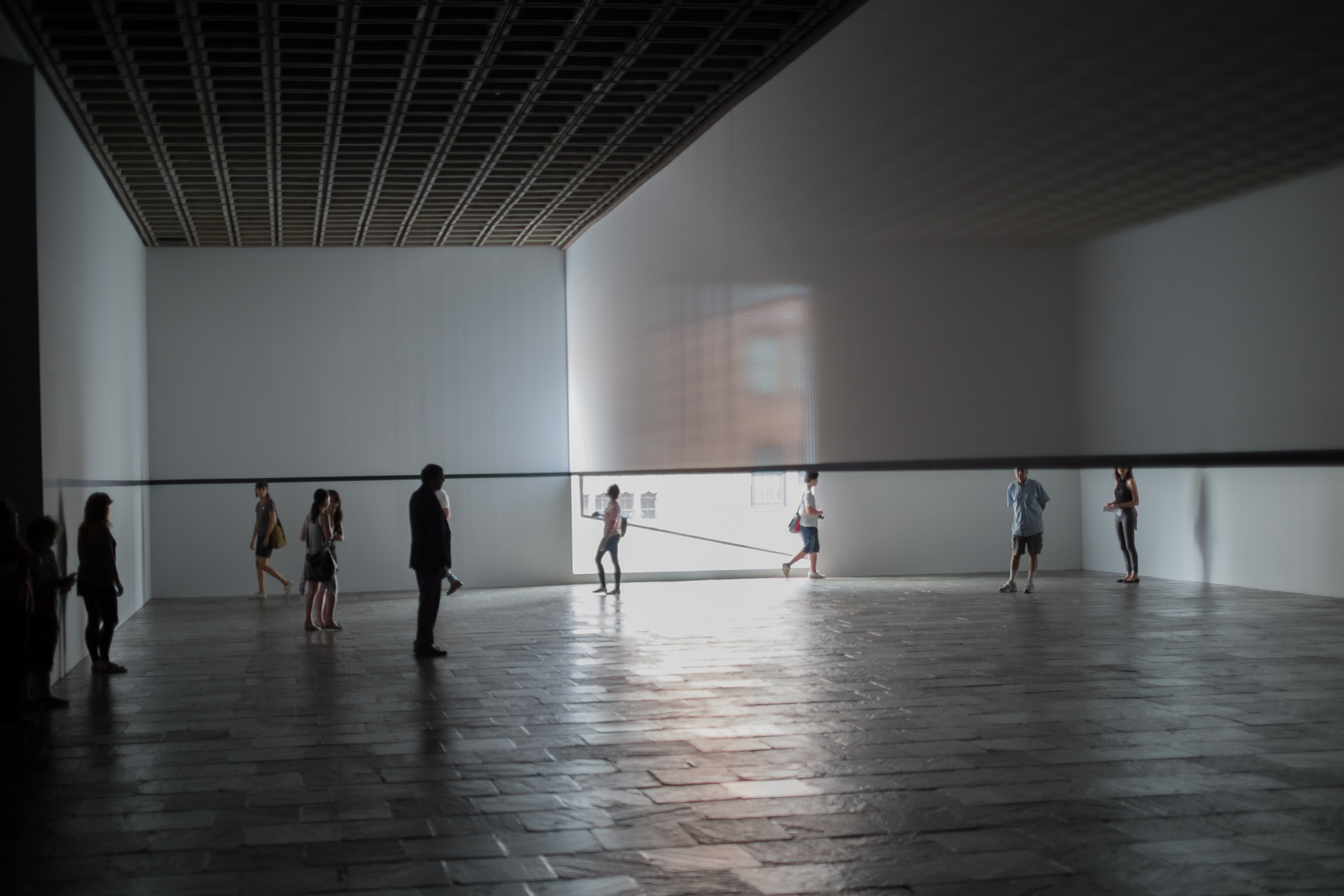
A scrim used in an art installation

A scrim is a woven material, either of fine or coarse material.

== Light gauzy material ==
A scrim is a very light textile made from fiber based materials, such as yarn.

Since scrim is lightweight and translucent (allowing light to pass through), it is quite often used for making curtains. It is also used for bookbinding and upholstery.

Scrims have seen extensive use in theater. It is used in theater for special effects. A very common term typically used for these purposes is called sharks tooth scrim. Weaved scrim is called its name because the weave resembles a set of triangles that resemble a shark's teeth with openings similar in size to a window screen. However, in theater, a scrim can refer to any such thin screen and is made of a wide variety of materials.

The most common use of scrim is the 'reveal effect', in which an actor or scene is made to appear or disappear by using the scrim and appropriate lighting. Other common effects include sharp silhouettes, backlit from behind the scrim, or other shadow effects (shrinking and growing a shadow).

The bobbinet/bobbinette is a type of scrim that has a hexagonal hole shape and comes in a variety of hole sizes. It is used for a number of lighting effects in the film and theater industries.

Scrim is also used in clothing, usually covering the face or head. This allows the wearer to look out while preventing others from seeing in. This may also be combined with camouflage to completely hide a person, such as a sniper, hunter, or wildlife photographer. The term "helmet scrim" refers to the practice of adorning a helmet with scrim and/or other fabrics to make its shape less obvious; the practice of adding scrim to a helmet is often done as much for reasons of perceived status as it is for reasons of actually improving camouflage. British and other forces have also made constant use of issued or privately purchased scrim fabric as a sort of improvised scarf that can be quickly converted into a face veil or similar.

A scrim was an integral part of the Beijing Olympic Stadium in Beijing. It was the screen running around the top of the stadium during the opening ceremonies on which all kinds of scenes were projected. Li Ning ran around it just before the cauldron lighting for 2008 Summer Olympics.

A scrim (also called a screen) is used as an acoustically transparent covering for a loudspeaker to protect the diaphragm and dust cap, or as an air filter element to protect the voice coil and other components of the transducer.

A scrim can be used on the back of a perforated (acoustically transparent) movie screen to reduce the amount of light shining through it.

A scrim can be used as a base layer for automotive loop pile and cut pile carpeting.

=== Applications to stage lighting ===
Scrims both reflect and transmit light. This means that if a light from a front-of-house position is shone at a scrim, then both the scrim and everything behind it will be lit. This can lead to a variety of interesting effects:

- A scrim will appear entirely opaque if everything behind it is unlit and the scrim itself is grazed by light from the sides or from above.
- A scrim will appear nearly transparent if a scene behind it is lit, but there is no light on the scrim.
- A dreamy or foggy look can be achieved by lighting a scene entirely behind a scrim.
- If a light with a gobo is aimed at a scrim, the image will appear on the scrim, but also any objects behind the scrim will be lit by the pattern as well.

In general, anything that is lit will be seen on both sides of a scrim. Scrims do not absorb light. Scrim can also be used in theater in combination with a cyclorama or backdrop. The idea is similar to the other uses. When the drop is lit (or images or video are rear-projected onto the back of the drop), the images or colors projected are visible. However, when the drop is not lit, the images or colors will disappear. A scrim can also help dull the image, creating a greater sense of depth.

Another effect is caused by layering two scrims, or even by placing a mirror behind a scrim and lighting it: the familiar moire effect. This can often cause audience disorientation.

== Reinforcement material ==
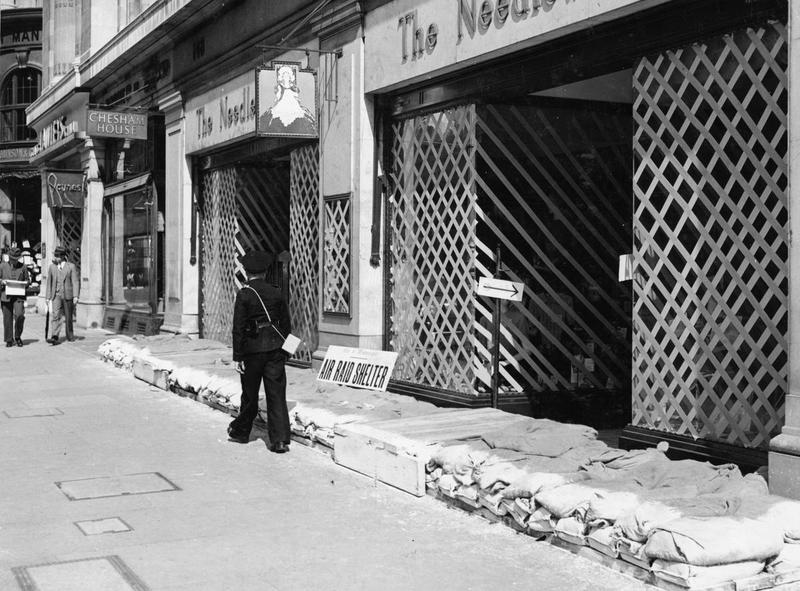
Shop windows in the United Kingdom extensively covered with scrim during the 1940–1941 Blitz

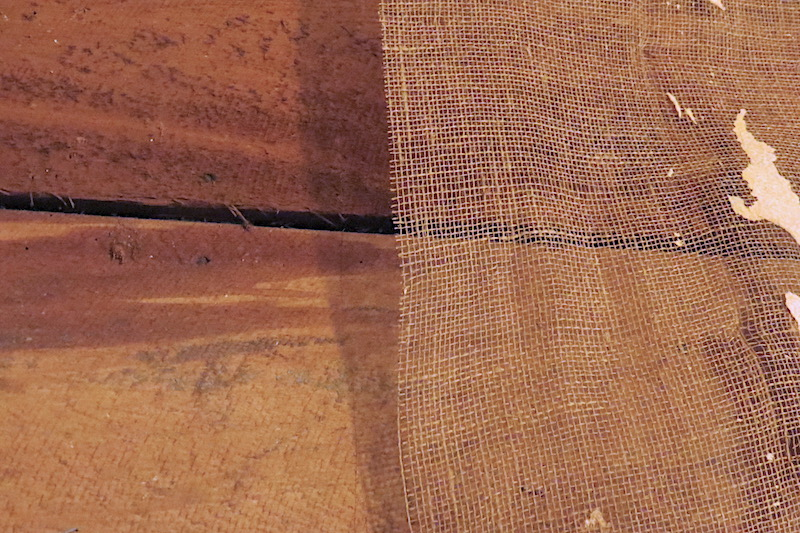
Scrim and sarking

The technique of using scrim as a reinforcement occurs commonly in the manufacture of glass-fiber or carbon-fiber composites. Scrim layers may cover the exterior surface of the carbon-fiber laminate for an improved protective surface. Jute scrim can reinforce plaster in sculpture when casting or working directly in plaster.

A similar usage of the term is found in sailcloth manufacture, where scrim is a strong loose weave of fibers laminated into the cloth to provide extra strength and stability to sails.

In carpentry, scrim is a very heavy, coarsely-woven fabric (similar to hessian or to coarse canvas) which is stretched over interior boards to provide support for wallpaper and to add extra rigidity. This method of construction, widely used in older houses, is often referred to as "Scrim and sarking", the sarking being the board.

Scrim is also an item that utilizes plies of tissue reinforced with a layer of nylon (much like a fishing line or heavy-duty mono-filament) or cotton thread. The layer of scrim is not counted in the ply count.

Scrim is a glass fiber (previously burlap) open-mesh tape used to cover joints in plasterboard/wall board before plastering. It prevents a crack from appearing in the plaster finish at a later date. The roll of tape may be plain or adhesive-coated to facilitate its installation.

Scrim was handed out during World War II to tape windows, so that they should not cause hazardous shrapnel in case of bomb blasts.
