= Membrane roofing =

Type of roofing system

Membrane roofing is a type of roofing system for buildings, RVs, ponds, and, in some cases, tanks. It is used to create a watertight covering to protect the interior of a building. Membrane roofs are most commonly made from synthetic rubber, thermoplastic (PVC or similar material), or modified bitumen. Membrane roofs are most commonly used in commercial application, though they are becoming increasingly common in residential application.

== Types ==
Single-ply membranes – There are three types of single-ply, or elastoplastic, products in use today that are defined by the chemical properties they possess: cured (or vulcanized) elastomers, uncured elastomers, and plastomers.

Cured elastomers (often referred to as thermoset) – Thermosets are synthetic rubbers that have undergone the vulcanization or "curing" process. Seams of materials are bonded by adhesives or chemicals, which over time weaken and separate unless maintained or reinforced. The finished roof's thickness is usually between 30 and 120 mils (thousandths of an inch; 0.75 mm to 1.50 mm). The most commonly used cured elastomer membranes are ethylene propylene diene monomer (commonly EPDM) and neoprene, although all thermoset products combined fail to account for more than 10% of all commercial roofing. This is in part due to studies being released in the 1980s to early 2000s showing the average lifespan of thermoset membranes between 15 and 20 years, although the products have undergone massive alterations since then.

Uncured elastomers (sometimes grouped with thermosets for simplicity) – Uncured elastomers are installed in a manner similar to thermoplastics in that they can be heat or solvent welded. The material then cures over time once exposed to the elements, and then exhibits the same qualities as vulcanized elastomers. The most commonly used uncured elastomers are chlorosulfonated polyethylene (CSPE), chlorinated polyethylene (CPE), polyisobutylene (PIB), nitrile butadiene polymer (NBP), although none of the products are known to be commonly used in the last decade, in part due to environmental concerns brought up regarding the chemical curing processes in the late 1990s. Thermosets are often referenced for their easy installation methods, high chemical resistances, having higher impact resistances (for some membranes), and resistance to high temperatures.

Plastomers (often referred to as thermoplastics) – Thermoplastics are membranes that are heat welded and develop strength in the welds at least equal to the original membrane material, forming a much stronger bond than chemically bonded thermosets. The most commonly used thermoplastics are PVC, KEE and TPO, taking up over 55% of the commercial roofing market. However, a common misconception is that these are the only types of materials.

Modified bitumen – Polymer modified bitumen membranes were developed in Europe in the mid-1960s and have been in common use throughout the United States since 1975. they are composed of one or more premanufactured sheets consisting of asphalt, reinforcing layers, and in some cases a surfacing is applied. During manufacture, plastics or rubbers are added to the bitumen while heating, modifying its properties to give it a higher softening point and greater elasticity. There are several ways of connecting pieces of this material. The most common method for bonding seams is by torch-application; however, the options of hot-mopping, using cold adhesive, and self-adhering materials are still sometimes used. Copolymers commonly used to modify asphalt include atactic polypropylene (APP), styrene-butadiene-styrene (SBS), styrene-butadiene rubber (SBR), and styrene-ethylene-butylene-styrene (SEBS).

== Advantages over asphalt flat roofing systems ==
These application types of membrane roofing show distinct advantages over the previously more common flat roofing method of asphalt and gravel (commonly referred to as built-up-roofs or "BUR"). In asphalt and gravel application, it can be very difficult to create a proper seal at all seams and connection points. This can cause a roof to leak early in its lifespan, and require much more maintenance. When installed correctly, newer materials are either seamless, or have seams as strong as the body. This eliminates most of the leakage concerns associated with flat roofing systems.

Repairs for asphalt and gravel roofs can be problematic, largely because it is difficult to locate the exact point of a leak. Newer systems can be patched relatively easily because breaks and leaks are easier to locate.

Originally asphalt roofing required a layer of gravel above it for two reasons. First, asphalt with direct exposure to sunlight degrades much faster, mainly due to the expansion and contraction throughout a day, and also the damage created by UV rays. Second, asphalt needs weight above to hold it down, because it sits on the top of a building, instead of being attached to it. Each of the newer types of membrane roofing systems contain materials that resist expansion and contraction, as well as reflect much of the UV rays. In addition, because these membranes either lack seams or have stronger bonding than traditional BUR seams, when expansion and contraction does occur it does not create leaks and breaks at these seams. These newer roofing systems are also usually attached directly to the top of a building, which eliminates the need for excess weight above.
