= Hessian fabric =

Woven fabric from jute or sisal

Hessian fabric, also known as "burlap" and "crocus"

Hessian (UK: /ˈhɛ.si.ən/, US: /ˈhɛ.ʃən/), burlap in North America, or crocus in the Caribbean, is a woven fabric made of vegetable fibres: usually the skin of the jute plant, or sisal leaves. It is generally used (in the crude tow form known as gunny) for rough handling, such as to make sacks in which to ship farm products and sandbags (although woven plastics now often serve these purposes), and for wrapping tree-root balls. However, this dense woven fabric, historically coarse, is also recently being produced in a more refined state—where it is known simply as jute—so as to provide an eco-friendly material for bags, rugs, and other products.

Hessian cloth comes in different types of construction, form, size and color. The name "hessian" is attributed to the historic use of this type of fabric as part of the uniform of soldiers from the former Landgraviate of Hesse (1264–1567) and its successorss –such soldiers were simply called Hessians.

The origin of the word burlap is uncertain, though it appeared as early as the late 17th century. Its etymology is speculated to derive from the Middle English borel ('coarse cloth'), the Old French burel and/or the Dutch boeren ('coarse'), in the latter case perhaps interfused with boer ('peasant'). The second element is the Dutch word lap, meaning 'piece of cloth'.

== History ==
Hessian was first exported from India in the early 19th century. It was traditionally used as backing for linoleum, rugs, and carpet.

== Uses ==
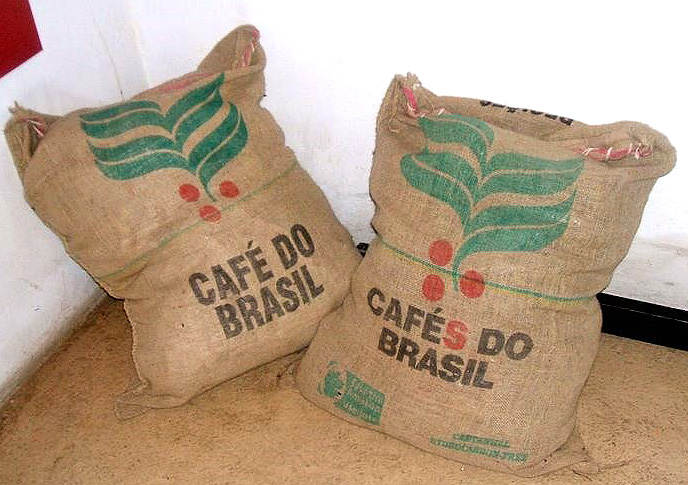
Brazilian coffee beans in hessian gunny sacks

Hessian is often used to make gunny sacks, and to ship goods like coffee beans and rooibos tea. It is breathable and so resists condensation and associated spoilage of contents. It is also durable enough to withstand rough handling in transit.

Its durability and handling when wet have also led to its use for temporary protection (as wet covering) to prevent rapid moisture loss during the setting phase of cement and concrete in the construction industry.

Hessian is also commonly used to make effective sandbags: hessian sacks filled with sand are often used for flood mitigation in temporary embankments against floodwaters, or in the building of temporary or field fortifications.

=== Transportation, handling of bulk goods, logistics and shipping ===
Agricultural products are often shipped in bags made from hessian jute fabric. Hessian jute bags (commonly known as gunnysacks) are used to ship wool, tobacco, and cotton, as well as foodstuffs such as coffee, potatoes, flour, vegetables, and grains. Hessian jute's ability to allow the contents of bags to breathe makes it excellent for preventing or minimizing rotting due to trapped moisture. In some cases, hessian can even be specially treated to help avoid specific kinds of rot and decay.

Hessian is also often used for the transportation of unprocessed dry tobacco. This material is used for much the same reasons as it would be used for coffee. Hessian sacks in the tobacco industry hold up to 200 kg (440lb) of tobacco, and due to hessian's toughness, a hessian sack can have a useful life of up to three years.

=== Landscaping and agriculture ===
Hessian is used in plant nursery and landscaping applications to wrap the exposed roots of trees and shrubs when transplanting. It can also be used for erosion control on recently cleared or disturbed or steep slopes, where it is laid upon the ground to help protect and stabilise the top layers of soil. One major advantage of hessian jute fabric is that, because it is made entirely from natural vegetable fibers, it is completely biodegradable.

This property also makes it extremely useful in landscaping and agricultural uses that require incorporating fabric support into outdoor projects. Landscape designs that include tree transplantation often rely on hessian jute to ensure that young trees arrive at the planting venue intact and unharmed. This is achieved by wrapping hessian jute fabric around the roots and soil of a tree shortly after digging it from its original location. The breathability of the fabric allows sufficient aeration of the soil, and the hessian's moisture-resistant properties prevent excess water from accumulating and allowing the growth of mold, mildew, or other types of rot. Once planted, young trees may require the protection of hessian jute to ward off mice and other rodents that might otherwise eat their bark and compromise their structure. To keep rodents at bay, landscapers often wrap swathes of hessian jute around the trunks of young trees of all varieties.

In addition to protecting from animals, hessian jute also has the capacity to protect trees from excessive sun and wind. By building windbreaks from hessian jute, landscapers can exert some control over the environment in which young trees grow, thus maximizing their chances of growing to maturity so that they can withstand more intense weather conditions.

For planting grass, on areas that have steep slopes or high levels of soil erosion, a layer of hessian jute tacked on over grass seeds can prevent seeds from being moved by rain, runoff, hungry birds, or wind. Landscapers can use this fabric for many uses due to its strength, durability, moisture resistance, and protective properties.

=== Emergency response: floods, fires, animal rescue ===
Hessian bags are often deployed as sandbags as a temporary response to flooding. Because of their material, they can either be reused or can be composted after use. Agencies like the State Emergency Service in Australia and Technisches Hilfswerk in Germany often deploy sandbags, and these are found in the majority of their emergency response vehicles. Plastic bags have been used as a substitute, but SES units have found hessian bags to be more versatile as they can be used in a variety of rescue applications: as an edge protector for rope rescue operations, for use as padding on slings used in animal rescue or used to dampen and beat out bushfires.

=== Protection ===
Soldiers filling sandbags

Sandbags made of Hessian fabric are a historic form of temporary protection, used to shield both structures and troops from bullets, bombs, and other threats.

=== In beekeeping ===
Hessian fabric is often used as smoker fuel in beekeeping because of its generous smoke generation and ease of ignition.

=== Apparel ===
Due to its coarse texture, it is not commonly used in modern apparel. However, this roughness gave it a use in a religious context for mortification of the flesh, where individuals may wear an abrasive shirt called a cilice or "hair shirt" and in the wearing of "sackcloth" on Ash Wednesday. During the Great Depression in the US, when cloth became relatively scarce in the largely agrarian parts of the country, many farming families used burlap cloth to sew their own clothes. In Jamaica and certain parts of the Caribbean it is known as crocus, where enslaved Africans repurposed discarded hessian sacks into clothing. A traditional costume of Jamaican Maroons uses a similar fabric to pay homage to their ancestors.

Owing to its durability, open weave, naturally non-shiny refraction and fuzzy texture, hessian is often used in the fabrication of ghillie suits for 3D camouflage. It was also a popular material for camouflage scrim on combat helmets during World War II. Until the advent of the plastic "leafy" multi-color net system following the Vietnam War, burlap scrim was also woven onto shrimp and fish netting to create large-scale military camouflage netting.

=== In art ===
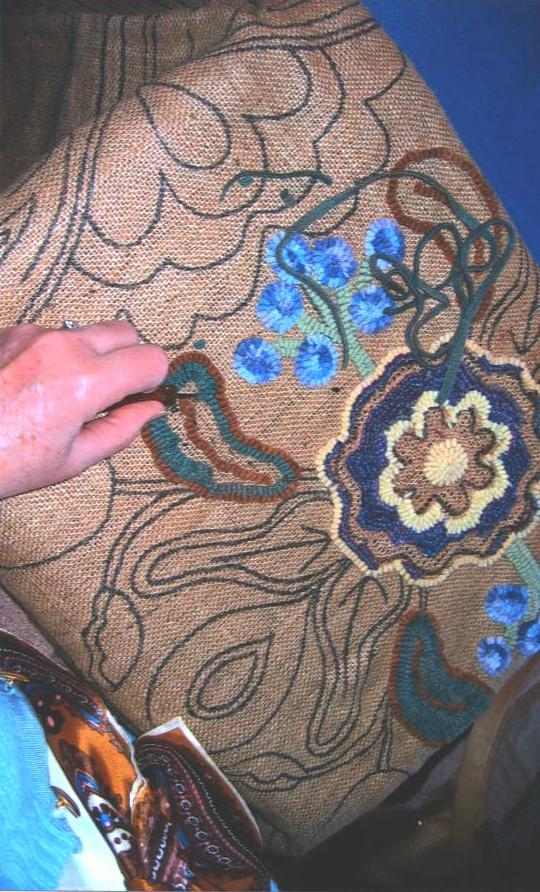
Rug making on hessian

Hessian has been used by artists as an alternative to canvas made from cotton or linen — that is, it can be stretched (eg, over a wooden frame) to create a painting or working surface. It also is used as a backing for decorative art, such as an ornamental rug.

=== Building material ===
In the 19th and first half of the 20th century, in Australia, hessian fabric, laid over a crude timber framework, was used to create the walls of primitive dwellings, particularly in mining towns and in settlements of unemployed people during the Great Depression.

The resulting semi-permanent structures — part way between a tent and a permanent dwelling made of conventional materials — were inexpensive to build. The durability and weatherproofing of the hessian walls were often improved by painting the hessian fabric with lime wash or conventional house paint, creating a less permeable, more rigid, rot-proof wall of a more attractive appearance. Hessian fabric was also used to create simple internal partitions. Roofing was typically corrugated iron, but sometimes canvas, usually with an earthen floor.

Hessian was also used for the internal lining of some slab huts in Australia.
