= Square (unit) =

Unit of area equal to 100 square feet

- Unit of: area
- Symbol: Square

Conversions
1 Square in ...	... is equal to ...
- square foot: 100
- square metre: 9.3

The square is an Imperial unit of area that is used in the construction industry in the United States and Canada, and was historically used in Australia. One square is equal to 100 square feet (9.3 m^{2}). Examples where the unit is used are roofing shingles, metal roofing, vinyl siding, and fibercement siding products. Some home builders use squares as a unit in floor plans to customers.

When used in reference to material that is applied in an overlapped fashion, such as roof shingles or siding, a square refers to the amount of material needed to cover 100 square feet when installed according to a certain lap pattern. For example, for a shingle product designed to be installed so that each course has 5 in (130 mm) of exposure, a square would actually consist of more than 100 square feet of shingles in order to allow for overlapping of courses to yield the proper exposed surface. As roofs or siding are unlikely to precisely fit, wastage needs to be taken into account.

Construction in Australia no longer uses the square as a unit of measure, and it has been replaced by the square metre. The measurement was often used by estate agents to make the building sound larger as the measure includes the areas outside under the eaves, and so cannot be directly compared to the internal floor area. Residential buildings in the state of Victoria, Australia are sometimes still advertised in squares.

== See also ==
- List of unusual units of measurement
