= Vinyl roof membrane =

PVC roofing membrane used in commercial construction

A vinyl roof membrane is class of roofing materials, often used for low-slope roofs. Membranes represent an alternative to poured asphalt roofing. A range of membrane materials are marketed. Several polymer membranes are employed for roofing, each with their own advantages. The "vinyl" (PVC)-roofing is fire-proof. Roofing is a major application for PVC.

Biodegradability of membrane roofing has been one topic of interest. Also of interest is the use of white membranes to minimize cooling requirements for the building. The reflectivity of white membrane roofs degrades due to a variety of environmental factors.

Vinyl roofing is a topic covered by the Chemical Fabrics and Film Association (CFFA), which represents manufacturers of PVC and related flexible-film products. Similar membranes are also used for swimming pool covers.
