= Practical Solar =

American heliostat manufacturer

- Industry: Solar power
- Founded: 2004
- Founder: Bruce Rohr
- Headquarters: Boston, United States
- Key people: Bruce Rohr, CEO and president
- Products: heliostats
- Website: practicalsolar.com

Practical Solar, Inc. is an American manufacturer of heliostats used for concentrating solar power, as well as for residential and commercial natural lighting (daylighting) applications. The company, located in Boston, Massachusetts, introduced its heliostat system for sale in February 2009. According to the detailed agenda for the 5th Annual Conference on Clean Energy in Boston, Practical Solar’s chief operating officer David Howell made a presentation seeking funding for the company at the “Investor Pitch Session” on November 12, 2009.

== Heliostats ==
Practical Solar’s heliostats are small in the spectrum of heliostats commercially available for harnessing solar thermal energy. They each have 8 square feet (0.74 meters) of reflector area. To put this in perspective, the heliostats in a solar power tower project in Seville, Spain each have reflectors nearly 1,300 square feet (120 m^{2}) in size (120 square meters). Practical Solar’s heliostat system is the first computer-controlled heliostat system that can be installed by hand, using only hand tools.

Practical Solar’s founder Bruce Rohr suggested in Northeast Sun magazine that small heliostats are “more reliable and more cost-effective per square meter of reflective area” than the larger heliostats typically used in solar power tower projects. Although a larger number of small heliostats would be needed for a solar power tower project, Mr. Rohr suggested that the total installation area would be about the same, and that the installed price per watt delivered would be lower with small heliostats than large heliostats.

Practical Solar’s web site states that residential customers also use their heliostats for direct space heating, drying mold, melting ice dams on roofs, and melting snow.
