= Ice dam =

Ice dam may refer to:

- Ice jam on a river
- Glacial ice blocking an unfrozen river, creating a proglacial lake
- Ice dam (roof), on the eave of a roof
