= Ice Dam Guys =

Ice Dam Removal Company

Ice Dam Guys, LLC
- Company type: Private
- Industry: Ice dam removal services
- Founded: 2010
- Founder: Palumbo Services
- Headquarters: Minneapolis, Minnesota, United States
- Area served: Contiguous United States

Ice Dam Guys, LLC is a nationwide ice dam removal company based in Minneapolis, Minnesota.

== History ==
Minneapolis-based Palumbo Services was the parent company, but in 2010, the owner got the rights for Ice Dam Guys. Ice Dam Guys operates throughout the contiguous United States including in Oregon, Idaho, Illinois, and Massachusetts.
