= Oakton Gables =

- U.S. National Register of Historic Places
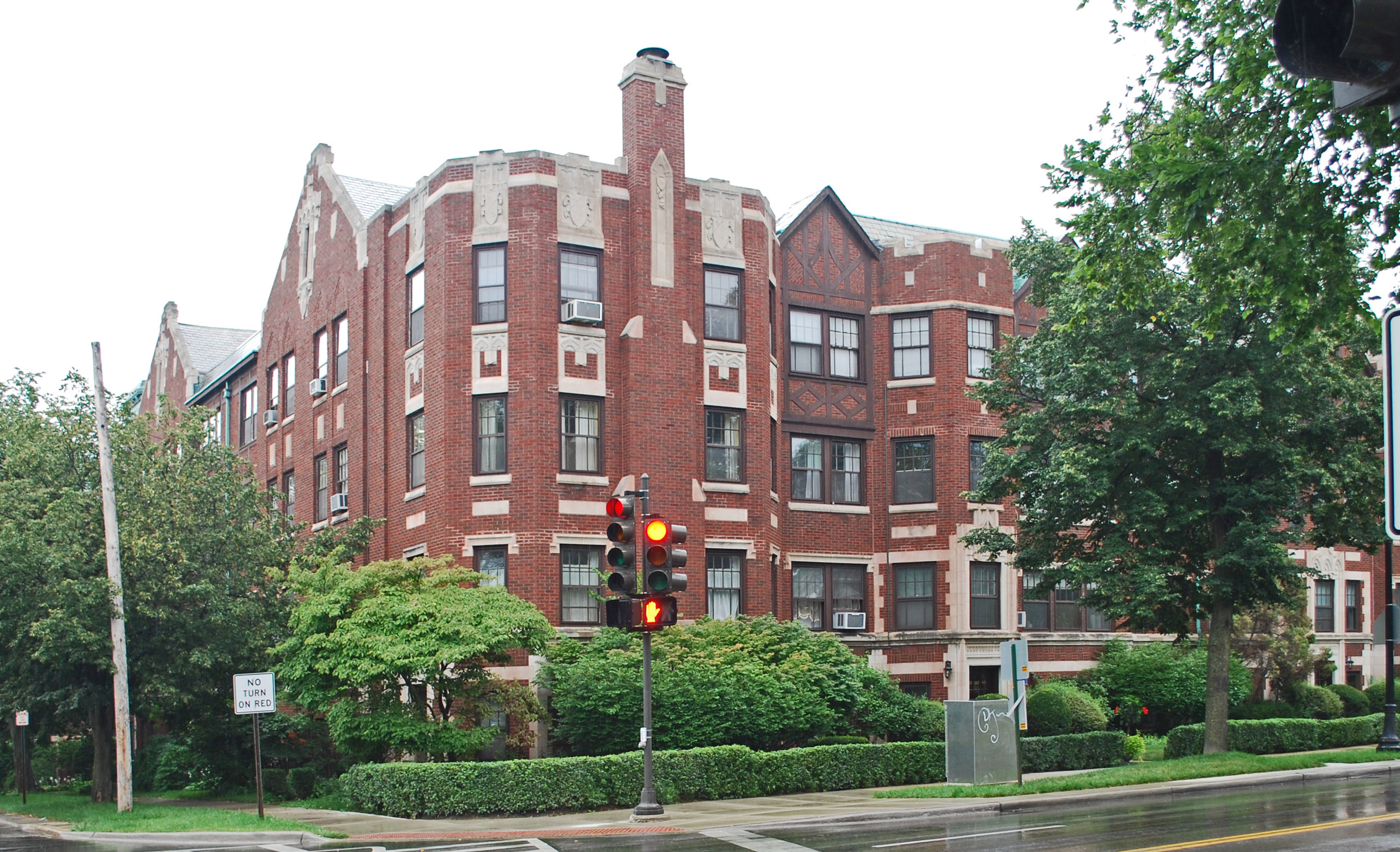
- Oakton Gables in 2010

- Location within Chicago metropolitan area Location within Illinois Location within the United States
- Location: 900-910 Oakton and 439-445 Ridge, Evanston, Illinois
- Coordinates: 42°01′35″N 87°41′07″W
- Area: less than one acre
- Built: 1927
- Architect: Godfrey E. Larson
- Architectural style: Tudor Revival
- MPS: Suburban Apartment Buildings in Evanston TR
- NRHP reference No.: 84001024
- Added to NRHP: March 15, 1984

Oakton Gables is a historic apartment building at the southeast corner of Oakton Street and Ridge Avenue in Evanston, Illinois. The three-story brick building was built in 1927. Architect Godfrey E. Larson designed the Tudor Revival building. The building's design includes limestone trim and window hoods, a raised central courtyard, and gables projecting above the roofline, some of which are half-timbered. The design's use of copper is particularly distinctive; the courtyard entrance has copper-clad towers on either side, and it is also used for downspouts and flashing.

The building was added to the National Register of Historic Places on March 15, 1984.
