= Rainwater tank =

Container for collecting and storing rainwater

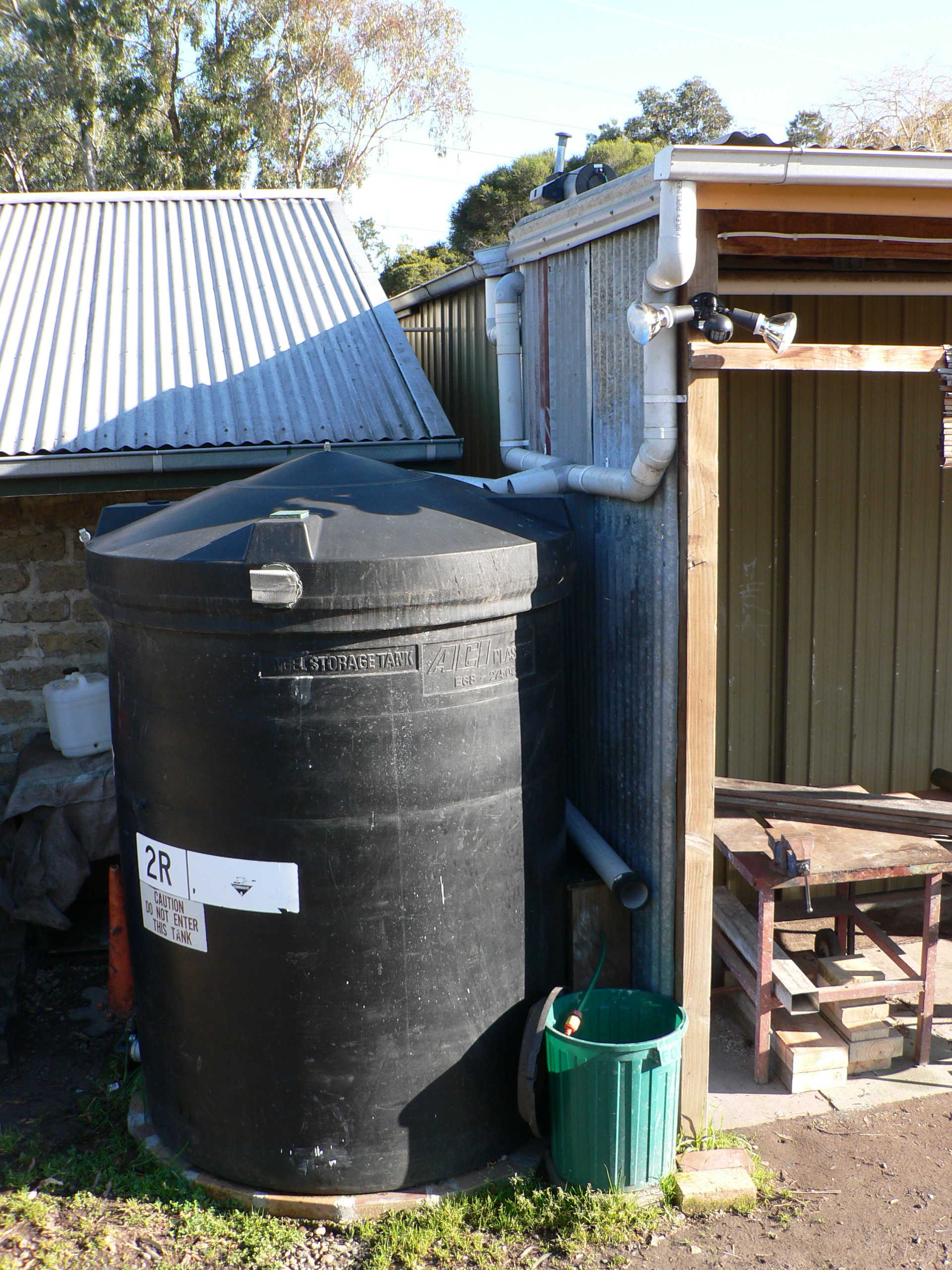
Rainwater tank in the CERES Community Environment Park in Melbourne, Australia

A rainwater tank (sometimes called a rain barrel in North America in reference to smaller tanks, or a water butt in the UK) is a water tank used to collect and store rainwater runoff, typically from rooftops via pipes. Rainwater tanks are devices for collecting and storing harvested rain. A rainwater catchment or collection (also known as "rainwater harvesting") system can yield 1,000 litres (260 US gal) of water from 1 cm (0.4 in) of rain on a 100 m^{2} (1,100 sq ft) roof.

Rainwater tanks are installed to make use of rainwater for later use, reduce mains water use for economic or environmental reasons, and aid self-sufficiency. Stored water may be used for watering gardens, agriculture, flushing toilets, in washing machines, washing cars, and also for drinking, especially when other water supplies are unavailable, expensive, or of poor quality, and when adequate care is taken that the water is not contaminated and is adequately filtered.

Underground rainwater tanks can also be used for retention of stormwater for release at a later time and offer a variety of benefits. In arid climates, rain barrels are often used to store water during the rainy season for use during dryer periods.

Rainwater tanks may have a high (perceived) initial cost. However, many homes use small scale rain barrels to harvest minute quantities of water for landscaping/gardening applications rather than as a potable water surrogate. These small rain barrels, often recycled from food storage and transport barrels or, in some cases, whiskey and wine aging barrels, are often inexpensive. There are also many low cost designs that use locally available materials and village level technologies for applications in developing countries where there are limited alternatives for potable drinking water. While most are properly engineered to screen out mosquitoes, the lack of proper filtering or closed loop systems may create breeding grounds for larvae. With tanks used for drinking water, the user runs a health risk if maintenance is not carried out.

== Contamination and maintenance ==
If rainwater is used for drinking, it is often filtered first. Filtration (such as reverse osmosis, ultraviolet sterilization, or ultrafiltration) may remove pathogens. While rainwater is pure, it may become contaminated by particulate matter in the air as it falls or during collection. While rainwater does not contain chlorine, contamination from airborne pollutants, which settle onto rooftops, may be a risk in urban or industrial areas. Many water suppliers and health authorities, such as the New South Wales Department of Health, do not advise using rainwater for drinking when there is an alternative mains water supply available. However, reports of illness associated with rainwater tanks are relatively infrequent, and public health studies in South Australia (the Australian state with the highest rainwater usage rate) have not identified a correlation. Rainwater is generally considered fit to drink if it smells, tastes and looks fine; however, some pathogens, chemical contamination and sub-micrometre suspended metal may produce neither smell nor taste and may not be visible.

Australian standards may differ greatly from other places in the world where rainwater is commonly used for drinking water. In the United States, rainwater is being increasingly used throughout the country for various purposes. In the semi-arid western state of New Mexico, for instance, many residents in the Taos and Santa Fe areas in particular use rainwater either for landscaping purposes or even all household uses (including potable indoor water). The "smells, tastes, and looks fine" standard used in the above paragraph is not an absolute indicator of rainwater safety. Most people who are rainwater users for potable purposes in the US make certain that their water is safe through filtration, ultraviolet sterilization, and testing.

Certain paints and roofing materials may cause contamination. In particular, a Melbourne Water publication advises that lead-based paints never be used. Tar-based coatings are also not recommended, as they affect the taste of the water. Zinc can also be a source of contamination in some paints, as well as galvanized iron or zincalume roofs, particularly when new, should not collect water for potable use. Roofs painted with acrylic paints may have detergents and other chemicals dissolve in the runoff. Runoff from fibrous cement roofs should be discarded for an entire winter, due to leaching of lime. Chemically treated timbers and lead flashing should not be used in roof catchments. Likewise, rainwater should not be collected from parts of the roof incorporating flues from wood burners without a high degree of filtration. Overflows or discharge pipes from roof-mounted appliances such as air conditioners or hot-water systems should not have their discharge feed into a rainwater tank.

"Copper Poisoning", a 2010 news article, linked copper poisoning to plastic tanks. The article indicated that rainwater was collected and stored in plastic tanks and that the tank did nothing to mitigate the low pH. The water was then brought into homes by copper piping. The copper was released by the highly acidic rainwater and caused poisoning in humans. While the plastic tank is an inert container, the collected acid rain could and should be analysed and pH adjusted before being brought into a domestic water supply system. The solution is to monitor stored rainwater with swimming pool strips, cheap and available at swimming pool supply outlets.

If the water is too acidic, the state, county or local health officials may be contacted to obtain advice, precise solutions and pH limits, and guidelines as to what should be used to treat rainwater to be used as domestic drinking water.

Maintenance includes checking roofs and rain gutters for vegetation and debris, maintaining screens around the tank, and occasionally desludging (removing sediment by draining and cleaning the tank of algae and other contaminants).

Rainwater tanks which are not properly sealed (secured at the top) may act as breeding grounds for mosquitoes.

Several options for dealing with the mosquito problem are:

1. Flushing all water once a week
2. Using a small amount of cooking oil to suffocate the larvae (the water is still suitable for landscape use after this)
3. Adding Bacillus thuringiensis israelensis to the water, a natural pest-control agent.
4. Adding mosquito-eating fish, such as the mosquitofish

== Tanks ==
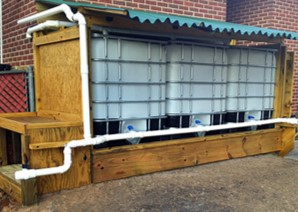
Example of caged IBC totes being used for rainwater harvesting

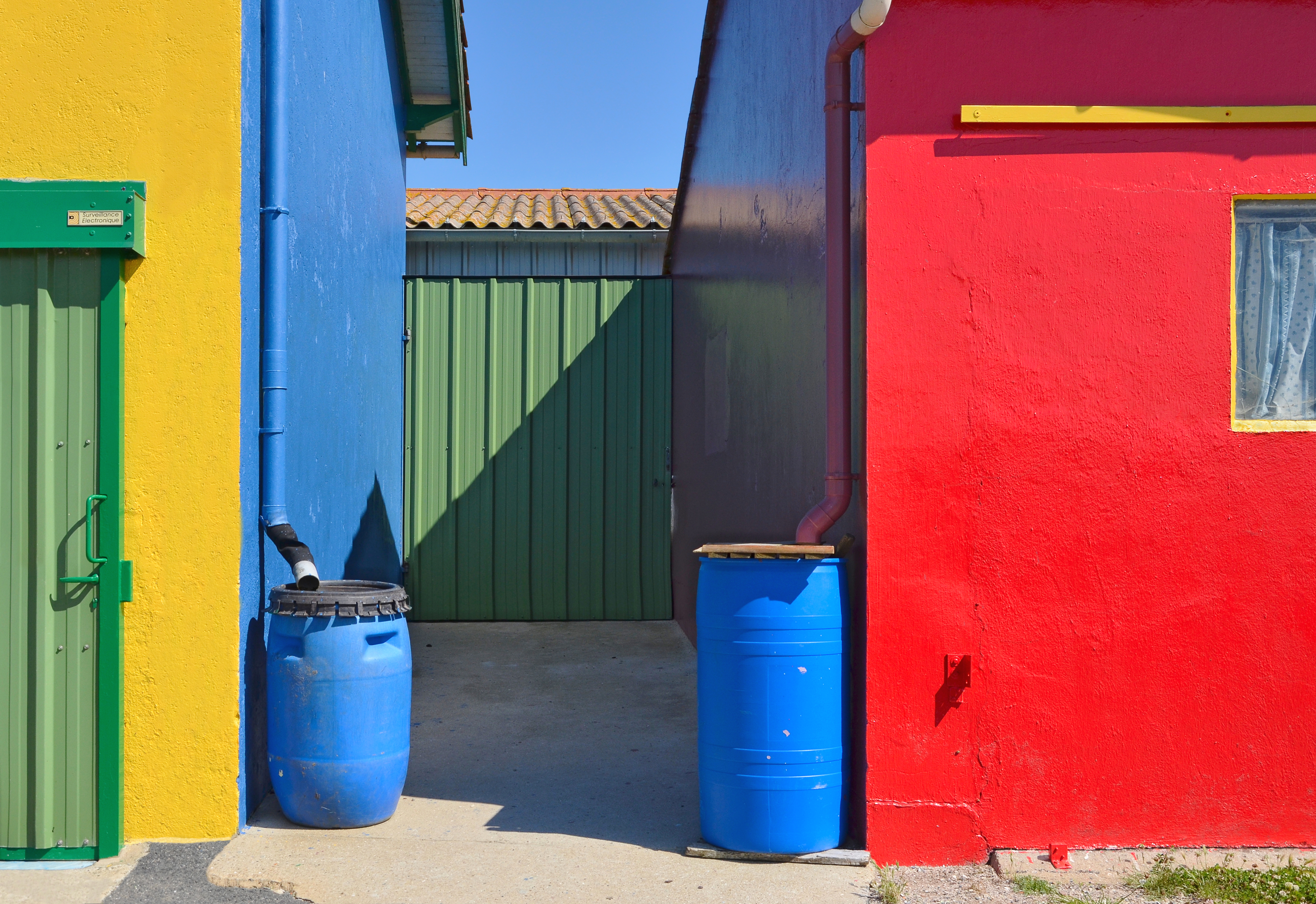
Rain barrels in Charente-Maritime, France

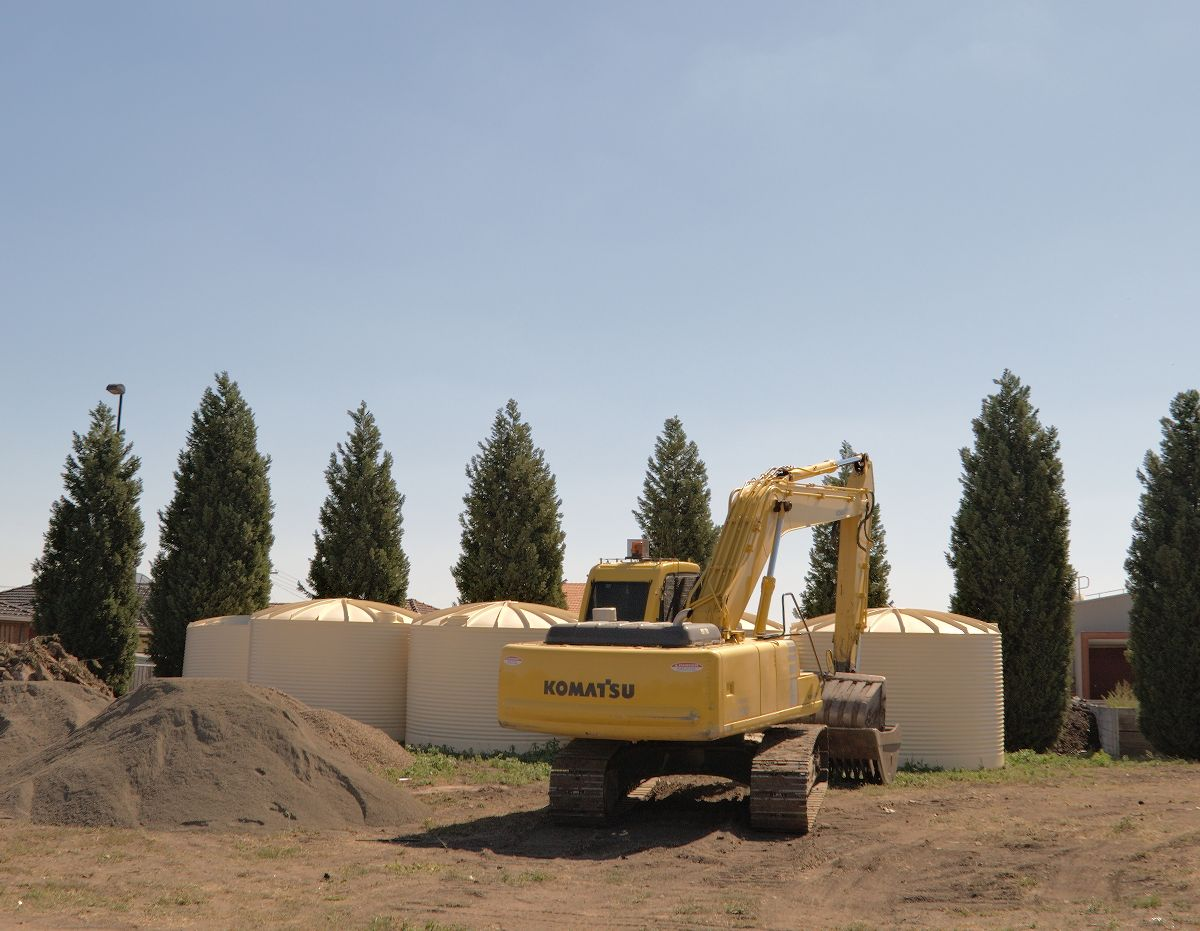
Large polyethylene rainwater tanks being installed

Rainwater tanks may be constructed from materials such as plastic (polyethylene), concrete, galvanized steel, as well as fiberglass and stainless steel which are rust and chemical-resistant. Full tanks are usually installed above ground, and are usually opaque to prevent the exposure of stored water to sunlight, to decrease algal bloom.

Tanks may be covered and have screen inlets to exclude insects, debris, animals and bird droppings. Almost all steel tanks currently produced for household rainwater collection come with a plastic inner lining to increase the life of the tank, prevent leaks and protect the water quality.

Apart from rooftops, tanks may also be set up to collect rainwater from concrete patios, driveways and other impervious surfaces.

Initial sizes typically ranged in capacity from around 400 to 100,000 litres (110 to 26,420 US gal), today modern technology has allowed modular and scalable applications to go into sizes of millions of litres or hundreds of thousands of US gallons.

Smaller tanks, such as the plastic (208 litres (55 US gal)-barrel) are also used in some cases. Larger tanks are commonly used where there is no access to a centralised water supply. Companies recommend a 1,135 litres (300 US gal) tank for a house supporting two people (if compost toilets are placed) and if the region receives at least 762 mm (30.0 in) of precipitation a year. If it receives less (between 254–762 mm (10.0–30.0 in), two or three of these 1,100-litre (300 US gal) tanks can be placed so that more rain can be gathered at times when it does rain. Also affecting tank size is predicted rainfall and rainfall variability; the higher prices for larger tanks; intended use of rainwater and typical consumption for these uses; the area of roof draining into the tank; security of supply desired.

Most rainwater catchment tanks used throughout the world are composed of virgin polyethylene, a substance which in the US is both FDA and NSF approved for potable water storage. Other types of tanks used for rainwater storage include fiberglass, galvanized metal, stainless steel, and concrete. Each type of tank has positive and negative aspects. Polyethylene tanks, when placed above ground, can be subject to algae growth as well as the possibility of a short life (about 20 years) due to normal UV exposure in sunlight. The very strong fiberglass tanks must undergo a specific coating process to be brought up to potable grade. Galvanized tanks must either be lined or coated both for potability as well as to prevent the inevitable rusting at any welded seams. Uncoated galvanized tanks will leach zinc into the stored water and are not recommended in most instances – certainly not for water stored for human consumption. Concrete tanks leach a more benign substance, lime, into stored water and many are used around the world for rainwater storage.

=== Underground tanks ===
One method of harvesting rainwater uses modular, scalable systems which are installable underground. These came as an evolution of a geosynthetic applications called Infiltration Tanks, which when stacked provide a void space volume which allows for the storing of water. Improved and more cost effective industrial design now allow for theoretically limitless storage of water underground.

A further way to store rainwater without worry of contamination by mosquitoes is to use underground storage tanks. Underground tanks keep the water too cool (below 12.8 °C or 55.0 °F) for mosquito larvae and also are dark, preventing both mosquito, bacterial, and algae growth. An article by Richard Hill goes into depth about the benefits of underground rainwater storage.

Underground tanks are seen as supporting access to water, with its attendant health and economic development benefits, in parts of the developing world.

=== Internal rainwater tanks ===
Rainwater tanks or drums may be used inside a house to provide thermal mass for a trombe wall (or water wall). Rainwater Hog modular tanks invented by Sally Dominguez to fit within building structure were used in the Modabode House of the Future floor and on the foyer wall of the Department of Sustainability building in Anglesea, Victoria, harnessing the higher value of the stored rainwater to add effective thermal mass to the enclosed spaces.

Specially designed rainwater tanks can also be embedded in or under the concrete slab of a building (stab tank).

A house in Cape Schanck, Victoria, Australia, uses an internal rainwater tank to provide cooling to the living room in summer. During winter the tank is drained and wrapped in an insulating jacket. The tank also provides structural support to the roof, and excess water is used for domestic use including drinking.

== Water supply augmentation ==
In Australia, the brand TransTank International manufactures portable water tanks from specially formulated polyethylene for transport and static applications. In some cities, installation of rainwater tanks may be mandatory, or may help a new building be approved. For example, in Victoria, Australia, new houses which have rainwater tank connected to all flush toilets are given an additional 1-star of the required 5-star House Energy Rating. Some governments subsidise purchases of rainwater tanks or provide rebates in areas where they are considered an important means of water supply augmentation. In the United States, Santa Fe County, New Mexico requires a rainwater collection system on all new construction with greater than 2,500 square feet (230 m^{2}), mostly for landscaping purposes and to prevent over-reliance on wells but in some instances because ground water is prohibitively expensive to obtain, if even available.

Rainwater to supplement drinking water supplies may be seen as an alternative to other water supply options such as recycling or seawater desalination. Tanks are often perceived to have environmental costs that are comparatively lower than other water supply augmentation options.

Rainwater collection can be made compatible with centralised water supply by tapping it using an electropump.

Widespread use of rain barrels also changes the amount of rainwater reaching the ground in a particular area and draining into streams. Depending on the climate, this either helps prevent erosion, sedimentation, and/or pollution, and can reduce the strain on stormwater drainage systems; or it could cause rivers to dry up and ponds to stagnate if the water is diverted to a different watershed. If collected water is used in the same watershed in which it is collected, rainwater collection actually can stabilize flow in rivers and provide more regular and filtered groundwater transfer into ponds.

== Legal issues ==
=== Colorado law ===
In the State of Colorado, United States, the installation of rainwater collection barrels is subject to the Constitution of the State of Colorado, state statutes and case law. This is a consequence of the system of water rights in the state; the movement and holding of rainwater is inextricably linked with ownership of water rights and is enshrined in the constitution of the State of Colorado. The use of water in Colorado and other western states is governed by what is known as the prior appropriation doctrine. This system of water allocation controls who uses how much water, the types of uses allowed, and when those waters can be used. This is often referred to as the priority system or "first in time, first in right". Since all water arriving in Colorado has been allocated to "senior water right holders" since the 1850s, rainwater prevented from running downstream may not be available to its rightful owner. In 2009, legislation in Colorado was enacted that permits capture of rainwater for residential use subject to strong limitations and conditions. To be permitted, a residence may not be connected to a domestic water supply system serving more than three single-family dwellings. The permit must be purchased from the State Engineer's office and is subject to water usage restrictions.

== See also ==
- Aljibe
- Cistern
- Drinking water
- Electropump
- Rain gutter
- Hand pump
- Irrigation tank - ancient India
- Plumbing
- Rainwater harvesting
- Rainwater harvesting in Canada
- Runoff water
- Storage tank
- Sustainable living
- Water Sensitive Urban Design
- Water tank
- Well
