= Leader head =

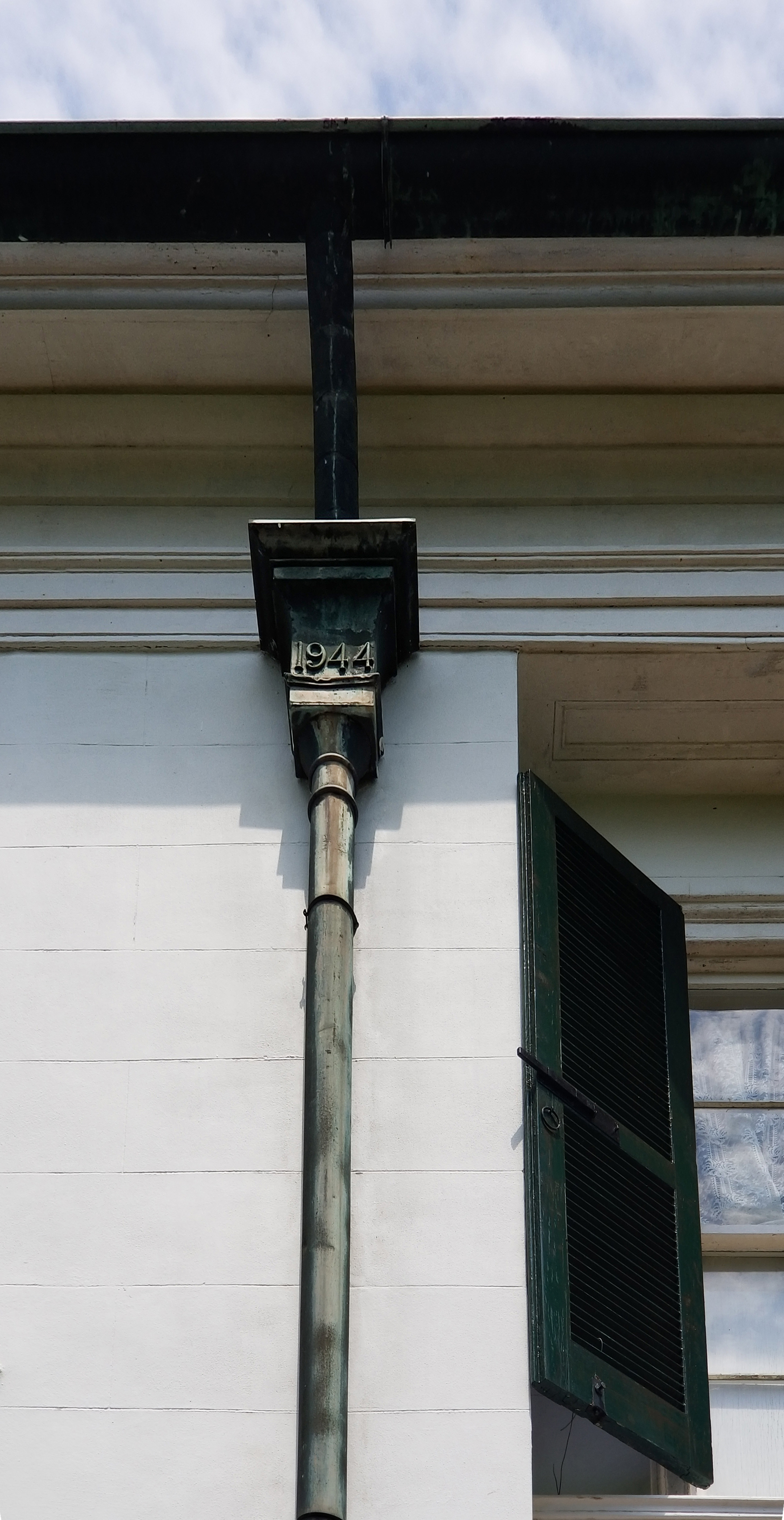
Leader Head at Evergreen Plantation, Louisiana, 1944.

Leader heads or conductor heads are funnel-shaped components of a roof drainage system connected in most cases to a gutter and to a downspout. The system conveys water from the roof that is collected in the gutters to the ground or into a storm water management system.

== Purpose ==
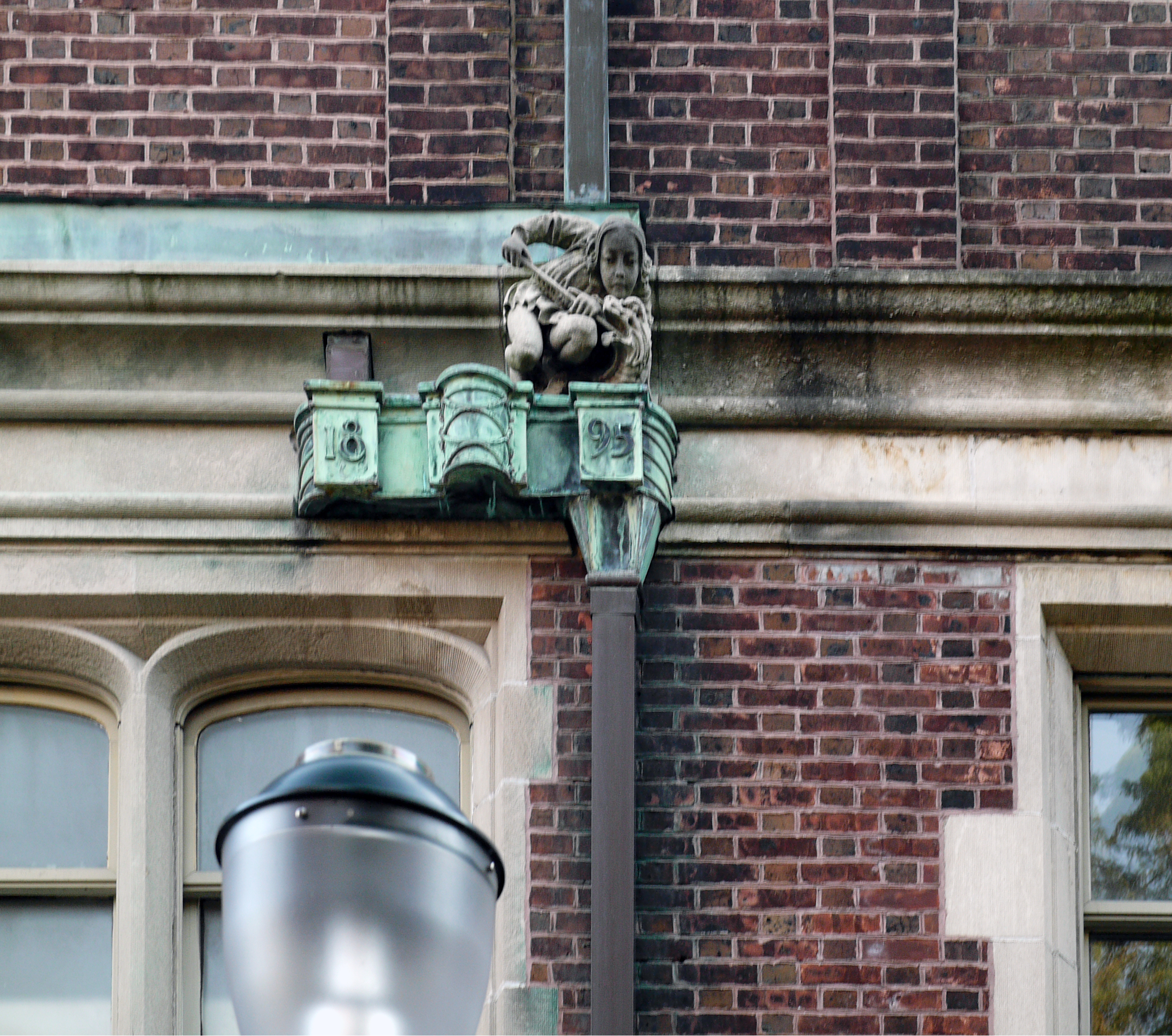
Copper Leader Head at Penn's Quadrangle, Philadelphia 1894

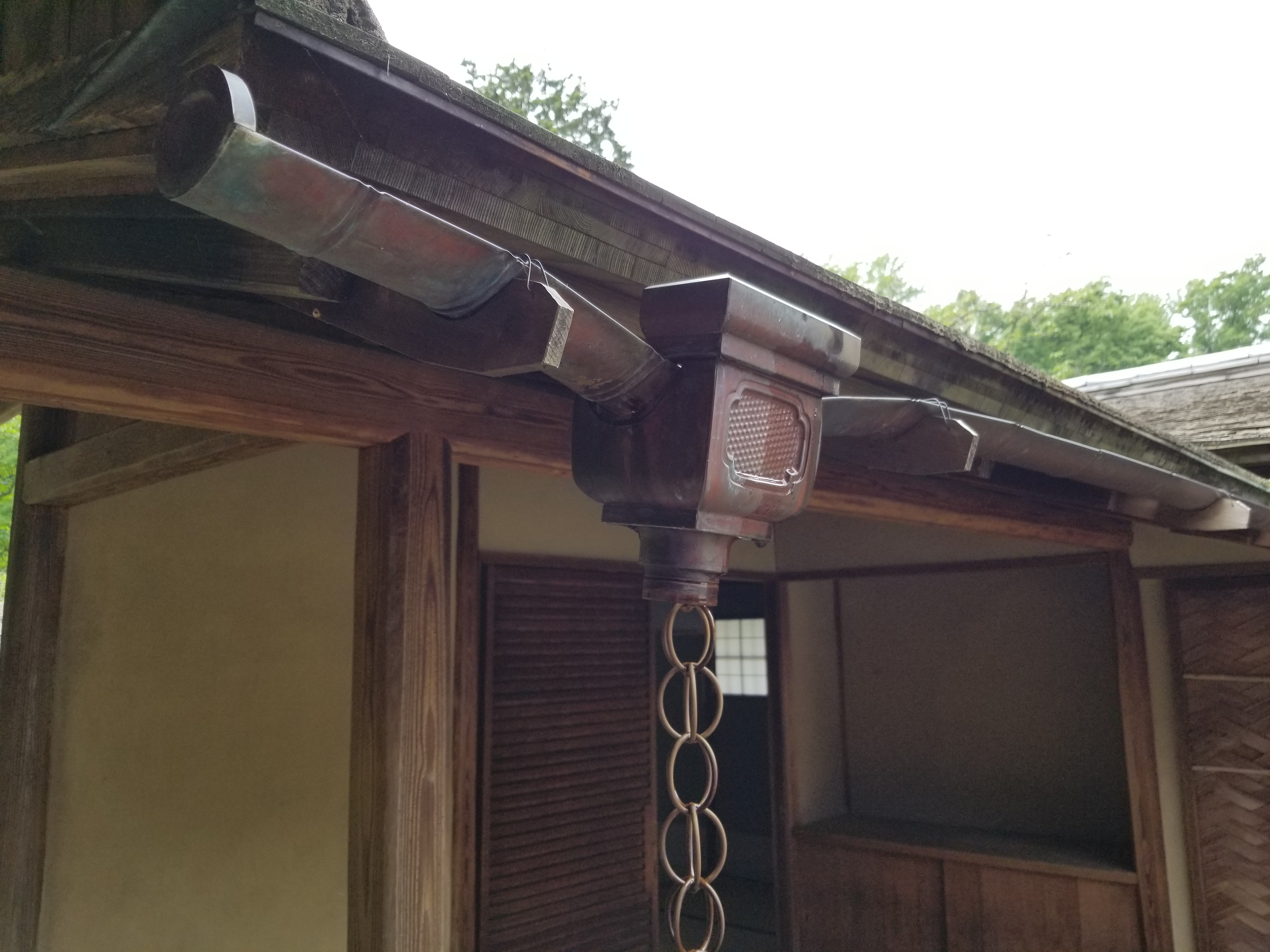
Copper Leader at Shofuso Japanese House and Garden in Philadelphia

The purpose of a leader head is to help transfer excess water from the roof onto downspouts, thus preventing the gutters from overflowing and water washing over the walls, which is a common occurrence in areas susceptible to heavy rain cycles. The use of leader heads also offers other benefits to the drainage system. Because the top of the funnel is open, air is constantly introduced into the system and water flows faster through the downspouts. Additionally, some leader heads are designed to receive more than one downspout, or in some cases more than one gutter converge onto a single leader head. Leader heads have historically provided an opportunity to incorporate a decorative element within their design. These elements, as are the other roof drainage system components, gutters, scuppers or downspouts, have to be sized to perform well, according to the amount of precipitation that they are intended to help alleviate.

Leader heads can also receive water from scuppers, which are used predominantly through flat roofs’ parapets. In those cases, the leader head provides the transition from scupper to downspout.

Leader heads can be incorporated into a rain water harvesting system, by helping direct the water into collection cisterns. This way, the harvested natural resource, rainwater, can be redistributed as best fits the needs. Whether the leader head fits directly into the collecting tank, or is connected to a down pipe first, contaminants and debris such as such as leaves, twigs from trees, and bird and other animal droppings among others, must be kept out of the tanks. For this purpose leaf guards or leaf diverters are very useful, since they are simple angled screens installed in such manner as to deflect leaves and debris while allowing water to pass through.

In Australia a leader head is known as a Rainhead.

== History ==
Leader heads have their origin in the gargoyles of Romanesque and Gothic buildings. Over time they have been redesigned to fit stylistic building trends, their function has always remained a constant.

Today, leader heads are typically made of sheet metal materials such as copper, steel, aluminum, zinc or brass, or cast materials such as aluminum; historically they were made of lead, copper, or cast iron. Leader heads are also made in different sizes and shapes such as square, round, hexagonal, etc.

== Codes (U.S.) ==
2018 International Plumbing Code | CHAPTER 11

Section 1106 Size of Conductors, Leaders and Storm Drains

- 1106.2 Size of Storm Drain Piping
- 1106.3 Vertical Leader Sizing
- 1106.4 Vertical Walls
- 1106.5 Parapet wall scupper location
- 1106.6 Size of Roof Gutters

(See associates tables 1106.3 & 1106.6 included in the respective sub-sections)

2018 International Building Code | SECTION 1502 ROOF DRAINAGE

- 1502.1 General
- 1502.3 Parapet wall roof drainage scupper and overflow scupper location
- 1502.4 Gutters

ASTM STANDARDS

- B101 Standard Specification for Lead-Coated Copper Sheet and Strip for Building Construction
- B32 Solder
- A924 Standard Specification for General Requirements for Steel Sheet, Metallic-Coated by the Hot-Dip Process

== See also ==
- Gargoyle
- Downspout
- Wiktionary:Leader (line 10)
