= List of The New Inventors episodes =

The New Inventors was an Australian television show, broadcast on ABC1 from 2004 to 2011. The program is hosted by broadcaster and comedian James O'Loghlin. Each episode features three Australian inventions and entertaining short video tape packages.

== Season 1 (2004) ==
Episode	Air Date	Inventions	Winner	Series People's Choice
1	March 10, 2004	Albac Mat		6
1	March 10, 2004	Coconet		
1	March 10, 2004	No Dump Blocking Plate	Won	
2	March 17, 2004	Adjustable Storage Tray	?	
2	March 17, 2004	Stiffies Underwear	?	
2	March 17, 2004	Vortex Insect Control Trap	?	
3	March 24, 2004	Air Sine	?	
3	March 24, 2004	Convertibles	?	
3	March 24, 2004	Rotary Piston Engine	?	
4	March 31, 2004	Cent-a-meter		
4	March 31, 2004	Reversible Surfboard		
4	March 31, 2004	Rojen Roof Safety Pole	Won	
5	April 7, 2004	Safezone	?	
5	April 7, 2004	Floorscape	?	
5	April 7, 2004	Greywater Saver	?	
6	April 14, 2004	Sprinkler Mounting System	Won	
6	April 14, 2004	Fold Away Cafe		
6	April 14, 2004	Floorbot		7
7	April 21, 2004	Sandtrakka		
7	April 21, 2004	Safe-t-mail	Won	
7	April 21, 2004	Tethermax		4
8	April 28, 2004	Dragonfly Super Pool Skimmer		1
8	April 28, 2004	TumbleTainer		
8	April 28, 2004	Inflatable Resuscitation Mask	Won	2
9	May 5, 2004	Hydragate		
9	May 5, 2004	Easy-Empty Wheelbarrow		
9	May 5, 2004	SDU: Sanitary Napkin Disposal Assembly	Won	3
10	May 12, 2004	Liberty Swing	Won	
10	May 12, 2004	Super Mixer Turbo		
10	May 12, 2004	Microbric		10
11	May 19, 2004	Hushbye Baby Rocker	Won	
11	May 19, 2004	Flood-proof fence		
11	May 19, 2004	EcoSmart Fire		
12	May 26, 2004	Alarmgate	?	
12	May 26, 2004	Snowglider	?	
12	May 26, 2004	Waterwall	?	
13	June 2, 2004	The Prefero p-pak	?	
13	June 2, 2004	Armsafe Firearm Lock	?	
13	June 2, 2004	Evader Tackling System	?	
14	June 9, 2004	Griffin Powered Vehicle	?	
14	June 9, 2004	Neetek	?	
14	June 9, 2004	Flipscreen	?	
15	June 16, 2004	The Smart Shower	?	
15	June 16, 2004	Greenfire	?	
15	June 16, 2004	Traveldock	?	
16	June 23, 2004	Versatile Outdoor Oven	?	
16	June 23, 2004	PV Solar Tiles	?	
16	June 23, 2004	Jot a Dot	?	
17	June 30, 2004	Travel Treadmill	?	
17	June 30, 2004	Biolytix Filter	?	
17	June 30, 2004	Contractors's Kerb Cleaner	?	
18	July 7, 2004	The Spinal Sensa		
18	July 7, 2004	The Picketup	Won	
18	July 7, 2004	Paint Reclaimer		
19	July 14, 2004	PotatoMagic		
19	July 14, 2004	IV-Ease Transportation System	Won	
19	July 14, 2004	Safecab		
20	July 21, 2004	Jittermat		
20	July 21, 2004	Microfan		
20	July 21, 2004	Silenceair	Won	
21	July 28, 2004	Anti Bio Technology	?	
21	July 28, 2004	Metal Cutting Nibbler	?	
21	July 28, 2004	MOBi-lert	?	
22	August 4, 2004	Power Genie		9
22	August 4, 2004	The Flexi-Wall Spinal Track	Won	
22	August 4, 2004	Wetronome		
23	August 11, 2004	The Wave Pillow		
23	August 11, 2004	Plug-Socket-Anchor in One		
23	August 11, 2004	Ecokeg	Won	
24	August 18, 2004	Fiobuoy	Won	
24	August 18, 2004	Room With A Viewfinder		
24	August 18, 2004	Aida Chair Lift		5
25	August 25, 2004	Audio Read	?	
25	August 25, 2004	Autoslide	?	
25	August 25, 2004	Levisit	?	
26	September 1, 2004	SquizBiz		
26	September 1, 2004	Safe-T-Max	Won	
26	September 1, 2004	The Anywhere Tent		
27	September 8, 2004	Nu-Mulch		
27	September 8, 2004	Rock Fishing Aid		
27	September 8, 2004	Tripstop	Won	
28	September 15, 2004	Shark Shield	?	
28	September 15, 2004	Easy Flow Guttering System	?	
28	September 15, 2004	Weeman	?	
29	September 22, 2004	Turbine Cooler		
29	September 22, 2004	Brikasaurus	Won	
29	September 22, 2004	Gemini Electric Motor		
30	September 29, 2004	Vulcan Wheel	Won	
30	September 29, 2004	Hydro Shear Mixer		
30	September 29, 2004	BiPu: Bioremedial In-field Personnel Unit		
31	October 6, 2004	E-Vap Cap	Won	
31	October 6, 2004	Ripa Grip		
31	October 6, 2004	Reaper Cheat Inflatable Rashie		
32	October 13, 2004	Roamio	?	
32	October 13, 2004	Vorta Jet Power Pack	?	
32	October 13, 2004	Happie Feet Bed Cradle	?	
33	October 20, 2004	Nature Nappy		
33	October 20, 2004	The Rotocult	Won	
33	October 20, 2004	3D Bracket – Wood Jointing System		
34	October 27, 2004	Cartar 125	Won	
34	October 27, 2004	Keysafe		
34	October 27, 2004	The Hawke Harvester		
35	November 3, 2004	Posture Pod	?	
35	November 3, 2004	Toestoppers	?	8
35	November 3, 2004	Emergalert	?	
36	November 10, 2004	Pumpwatch		
36	November 10, 2004	Breakout Barrier Release System		
36	November 10, 2004	Plastipile	Won	
37	November 17, 2004	Dektrac	Won	
37	November 17, 2004	Quick Stop		
37	November 17, 2004	Bellhop		
38	November 24, 2004; Grand Final	Silenceair (ep.20)	Won	—N/a
38	November 24, 2004; Grand Final	SDU: Sanitary Napkin Disposal Assembly (ep.9)		—N/a
38	November 24, 2004; Grand Final	MOBi-lert (ep.21)		—N/a
38	November 24, 2004; Grand Final	The Rotocult (ep.33)		—N/a
38	November 24, 2004; Grand Final	No Dump Blocking Plate (ep.1)		—N/a

== Season 2 (2005) ==
Episode	Air Date	Inventions	Winner	People's Choice
1	February 9, 2005	Eco-Cement		
1	February 9, 2005	Grow N Fit Extendable Dog Kennel		
1	February 9, 2005	waterHOG		
2	February 16, 2005	Backless Lingerie		
2	February 16, 2005	Molectra Tyre Recycling		
2	February 16, 2005	Mortar Machine		
3	February 23, 2005	Boretec		
3	February 23, 2005	Every Drop Shower Saver		
3	February 23, 2005	Sprinter		
4	March 2, 2005	Funhaler	Won	
4	March 2, 2005	Variable Support Bed System		
5	March 9, 2005	PTO Mate		
5	March 9, 2005	Regal Mini Sulky		
5	March 9, 2005	Water Genie		
6	March 16, 2005	Anchor Hammock		
6	March 16, 2005	Click 'N' Stick Skirting		
6	March 16, 2005	Global Track	Won	
7	March 23, 2005	Bakker Hinge Setting Device		
7	March 23, 2005	Eco Dry		
7	March 23, 2005	Willi Lili Buddy		
8	March 30, 2005	GE ClevaCorp Shower Arm		
8	March 30, 2005	Lockclip		
8	March 30, 2005	Power-Mate	Won	
9	April 6, 2005	K.I.S.S.S.		
9	April 6, 2005	Nurse's Joey		
9	April 6, 2005	The E-Ball Game	Won	
10	April 13, 2005	Auzzie Mozzie Tube		
10	April 13, 2005	Trike		
10	April 13, 2005	Vapotec	Won	
11	April 20, 2005	BiobiN		
11	April 20, 2005	GTi Stealth Injection System	Won	
11	April 20, 2005	Rescue Door System		
12	April 27, 2005	Rubber Crash Cushion		
12	April 27, 2005	Stanblast		
12	April 27, 2005	The Mussel		
13	May 4, 2005	Axle Tow Feeder	Won	
13	May 4, 2005	Protex Switching Technology		
13	May 4, 2005	The Cisternlink Aquasaver		
14	May 11, 2005	BottleCycler	Won	
14	May 11, 2005	Nviro Pit		
14	May 11, 2005	Sitsafe Table		
15	May 18, 2005	Double Chuck Drill		
15	May 18, 2005	SIFTS(Semi Intensive Floating System)	Won	
15	May 18, 2005	StadEzy Bed Pole		
16	May 25, 2005	Current Detective		
16	May 25, 2005	Liquid Frame System		
16	May 25, 2005	Smokers Pole	Won	
17	June 1, 2005	Cool Mind Monitor		
17	June 1, 2005	Liquid Surface Creations		
17	June 1, 2005	Litter Kwitter	Won	
18	June 8, 2005	Boomwing		
18	June 8, 2005	Bowtie		
18	June 8, 2005	Sea-Safe	Won	
19	June 15, 2005	Camboom		
19	June 15, 2005	Enviro Save Water System		
19	June 15, 2005	Karla Slide Ruler		
20	June 22, 2005	Barrier Mate		
20	June 22, 2005	Embergency Egress Rail		
20	June 22, 2005	Hotsuits	Won	
21	June 29, 2005	Kwik-Wall		
21	June 29, 2005	Portabe Retinal Camera		
21	June 29, 2005	Solectair		
22	July 6, 2005	Low Impact Harvester	Won	
22	July 6, 2005	Obex/Asta System		
22	July 6, 2005	Smartburn		
23	July 13, 2005	Quadcruise		
23	July 13, 2005	Sabre		
23	July 13, 2005	Sunsafe		
24	July 20, 2005	Genetag Hook		
24	July 20, 2005	Sea Gyro		
24	July 20, 2005	Sun-Brite		
25	July 27, 2005	ASE Mining Vest		
25	July 27, 2005	Perpetual Water		
25	July 27, 2005	Zygo		
26	August 3, 2005	Callander Slide Hammer		
26	August 3, 2005	Invisa-Beam Bed Monitor		
26	August 3, 2005	Sherriff Cattle Feeder	Won	
27	August 10, 2005	eWood		
27	August 10, 2005	Sipahh		
27	August 10, 2005	Sole Window		
28	August 17, 2005	Collapsa Crate		
28	August 17, 2005	Trackaxle	Won	
28	August 17, 2005	Zvino Bicycle Rim		
29	August 24, 2005	Bull Ant Block Lifter	Won	
29	August 24, 2005	On Your Feet		
29	August 24, 2005	Pulse Fishing Reel		
30	August 31, 2005	Beach Trekker		
30	August 31, 2005	Cooee Products (BaseBind) EcoTrax	Won	
30	August 31, 2005	Raintap Water Diverter		
31	September 7, 2005	JK Render		
31	September 7, 2005	StubbleStar	Won	
31	September 7, 2005	Zork		
32	September 14, 2005	Stamina Lift		
32	September 14, 2005	Wakley Mesh Mothering Pen		
32	September 14, 2005	ZipFix		
33	September 21, 2005	Anova Pot	Won	Won
33	September 21, 2005	Monumento		
33	September 21, 2005	Nobow Floor Tool Clamp		
34	September 28, 2005	Booby Bibs		
34	September 28, 2005	Hooper's Ice Cooler Insert		
34	September 28, 2005	Smart Brake	Won	
35	October 5, 2005	Bird Silo		
35	October 5, 2005	Fanaway		
35	October 5, 2005	Quick Hitch System	Won	
36	October 12, 2005	Cardibra	Won	
36	October 12, 2005	Solar Floor Heating		
36	October 12, 2005	Triclops Bodyguard		
37	October 19, 2005	Cane Toad Trap		
37	October 19, 2005	Continuous Gravity Separation (CGS) System		
37	October 19, 2005	Surface Tension Guttering	Won	
38	October 26, 2005	E-trakka	Won	
38	October 26, 2005	Lee-Beau Oven Guard		
38	October 26, 2005	Sunball		Won
39	November 2, 2005	Bed+Aid		
39	November 2, 2005	Eco-Friendly Planter Tube		
39	November 2, 2005	T-Line Safety System	Won	
40	November 9, 2005	Hexy the Hexagonal Rotating Pool Table		
40	November 9, 2005	PIMP (Platform i Mechanics Pit)	Won	
40	November 9, 2005	The No-Bull Method		
41	November 16, 2005	Family Winner	Won	
41	November 16, 2005	POD Fins		
41	November 16, 2005	Root Blade		
42	November 23, 2005	Molectra Tyre Recycling	Won	
42	November 23, 2005	Mussel		
42	November 23, 2005	Portable Retinal Camera		
42	November 23, 2005	Semi Intensive Floating System		
42	November 23, 2005	StubbleStar		

== Season 3 (2006) ==
Episode	Air Date	Inventions	Winner	People's Choice
1	February 15, 2006			
2	February 22, 2006			
3	February 3, 2006			
4				
5				
6				
7				
8				
9				
10				
11				
12				
13				
14				
15				
16				
17				
18				
19				
20				
21				
22				
23				
24				
25				
26				
27				
28				
29				
30				
31				
32				
33				
34				
35				
36				
37				
38				
39				
40				
41				
42	November 29, 2006	Grand Final 2006		

== Season 4 (2007) ==
Episode	Air Date	Inventions	Winner	People's Choice
1				
2				
3				
4				
5				
6				
7				
8				
9				
10				
11				
12				
13				
14				
15				
16				
17				
18				
19				
20				
21				
22				
23				
24				
25				
26				
27				
28				
29				
30				
31				
32				
33				
34				
35				
36				
37				
38				
39				
40				
41				
42	November 28, 2007	Grand Final 2007		

== Season 5 (2008) ==
Episode	Air Date	Inventions	Winner	People's Choice
1				
2				
3				
4				
5				
6				
7				
8				
9				
10				
11				
12				
13				
14				
15				
16				
17				
18				
19				
20				
21				
22				
23				
24				
25				
26				
27				
28				
29				
30				
31				
32				
33				
34				
35				
36				
37				
38				
39				
40				
41				
42	November 26, 2008	Grand Final 2008		

== Season 6 (2009) ==
Episode	Air Date	Inventions	Winner	People's Choice
1				
2				
3				
4				
5				
6				
7				
8				
9				
10				
11				
12				
13				
14				
15				
16				
17				
18				
19				
20				
21				
22				
23				
24				
25				
26				
27				
28				
29				
30				
31				
32				
33				
34				
35				
36				
37				
38				
39				
40				
41				
42	November 25, 2009	Grand Final 2009		

== Season 7 (2010) ==
Episode	Air Date	Inventions	Winner	People's Choice
1				
2				
3				
4				
5				
6				
7				
8				
9				
10				
11				
12				
13				
14				
15				
16				
17				
18				
19				
20				
21				
22				
23				
24				
25				
26				
27				
28				
29				
30				
31				
32				
33				
34				
35				
36				
37				
38				
39				
40				
41				
42	September 23, 2010	Grand Final 2010		

== Season 8 (2011) ==
Episode	Air Date	Inventions	Winner	People's Choice
1				
2				
3				
4				
5				
6				
7				
8				
9				
10				
11				
12				
13				
14				
15				
16				
17				
18				
19				
20				
21				
22				
23				
24				
25				
26				
27				
28				
29				
30				
31				
32				
33				
34				
35				
36				
37				
38				
39				
40				
41				
42	August 17, 2011	Grand Final 2011: Final Season		
