= Rain chain =

Decorative chain guiding water falling from a roof

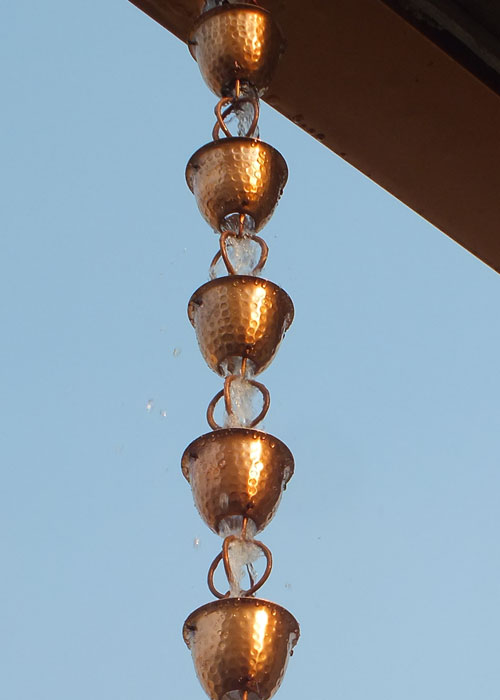
Rain chain with copper cups

Rain chains (Japanese: 鎖樋, kusari-toi or kusari-doi, literally "chain-gutter") are an alternative to downspouts and are widely used in Japan. Their primary purpose is decorative, turning the flow of rainwater from the gutter into a water feature as it travels downward to a drain or storage container. (Rainwater is sometimes collected for household usage.) They can also be found on temples.

Rain chains are typically either a series of metal cups, chained together with a hole in the bottom of each, or chain links that span vertically. Rain water run-off gets distributed from a rooftop gutter downward through the rain chain.

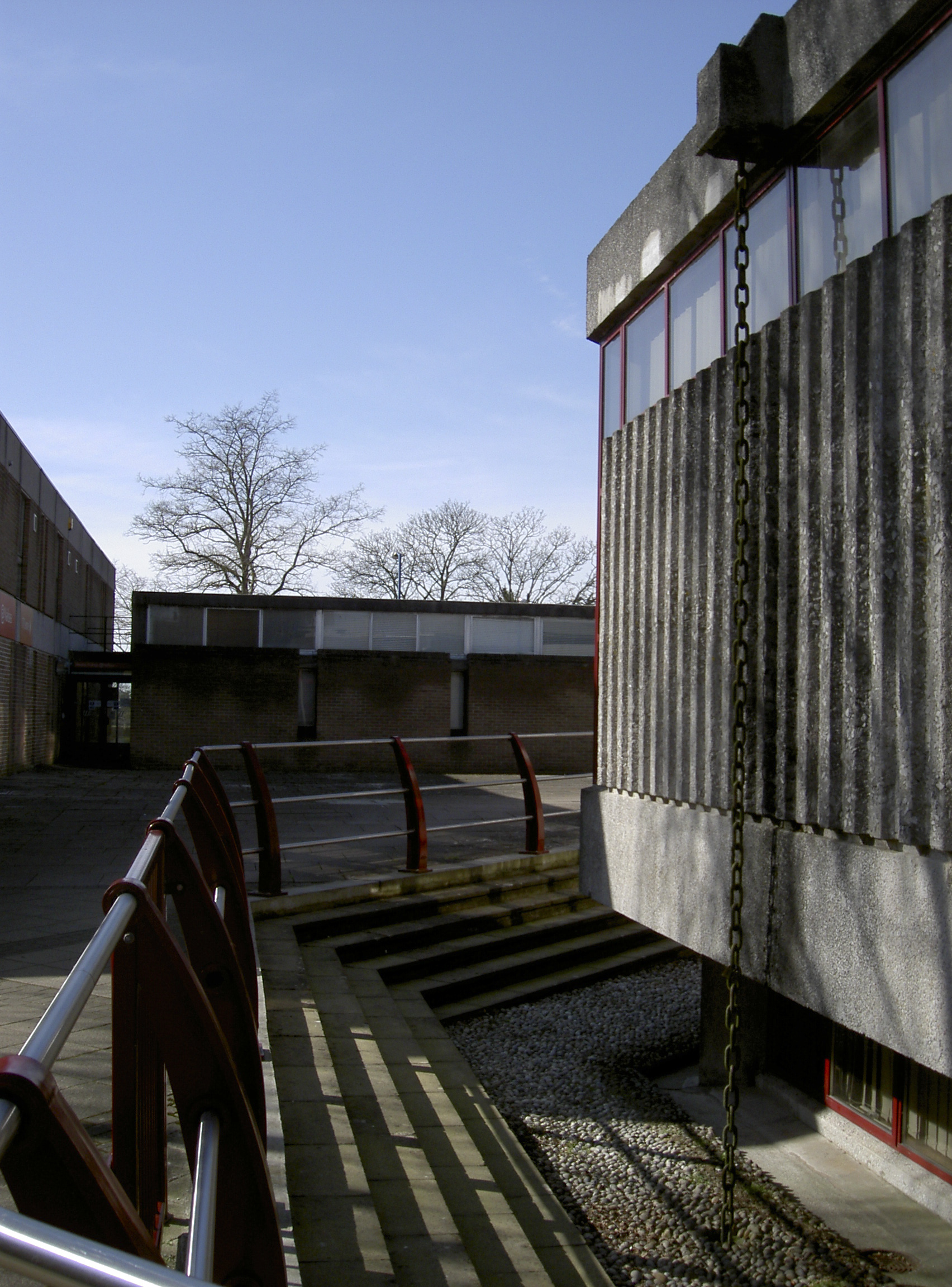
Rain chains on the Brutalist library at Nailsea, England

Temple rain chain on a rainy day

Rain chains have also been used in the West. Nordic vernacular architecture often used a simple stick as a rainwater guide, in similar fashion. They have also been used in the Modernist era, to juxtapose metal chains with a concrete or Portland stone facade. They are often seen in cup-shape, link and loop style, as well as decorative.
