= The New Inventors =

- Presented by: James O'Loghlin
- Country of origin: Australia
- Original language: English
- No. of seasons: 8
- No. of episodes: 314 (List of episodes)

Production
- Executive producer: Iain Knight
- Producers: Ingrid Arnott, Stewart Burchmore, Nicholas Searle, Belinda Gibbon, Pascal Adolphe, Jake Lloyd Jones
- Running time: 30 minutes

Original release
- Network: ABC1
- Release: 10 March 2004 – 17 August 2011

The New Inventors is an Australian television program, that was broadcast on ABC1 and hosted by broadcaster and comedian James O'Loghlin. Each episode featured three Australian inventions and short video tape packages. IP Australia, a supporter of the program, described it as a way for Australian inventions to gain publicity and possible entrance into the mass market.

The 200th episode of the program was broadcast on 29 October 2008.

The program aired on Wednesday nights at 8pm. The grand finale edition for season 7 was broadcast on 23 September 2010 on ABC. Currently, the show is being syndicated in the United States on Vibrant TV Network.

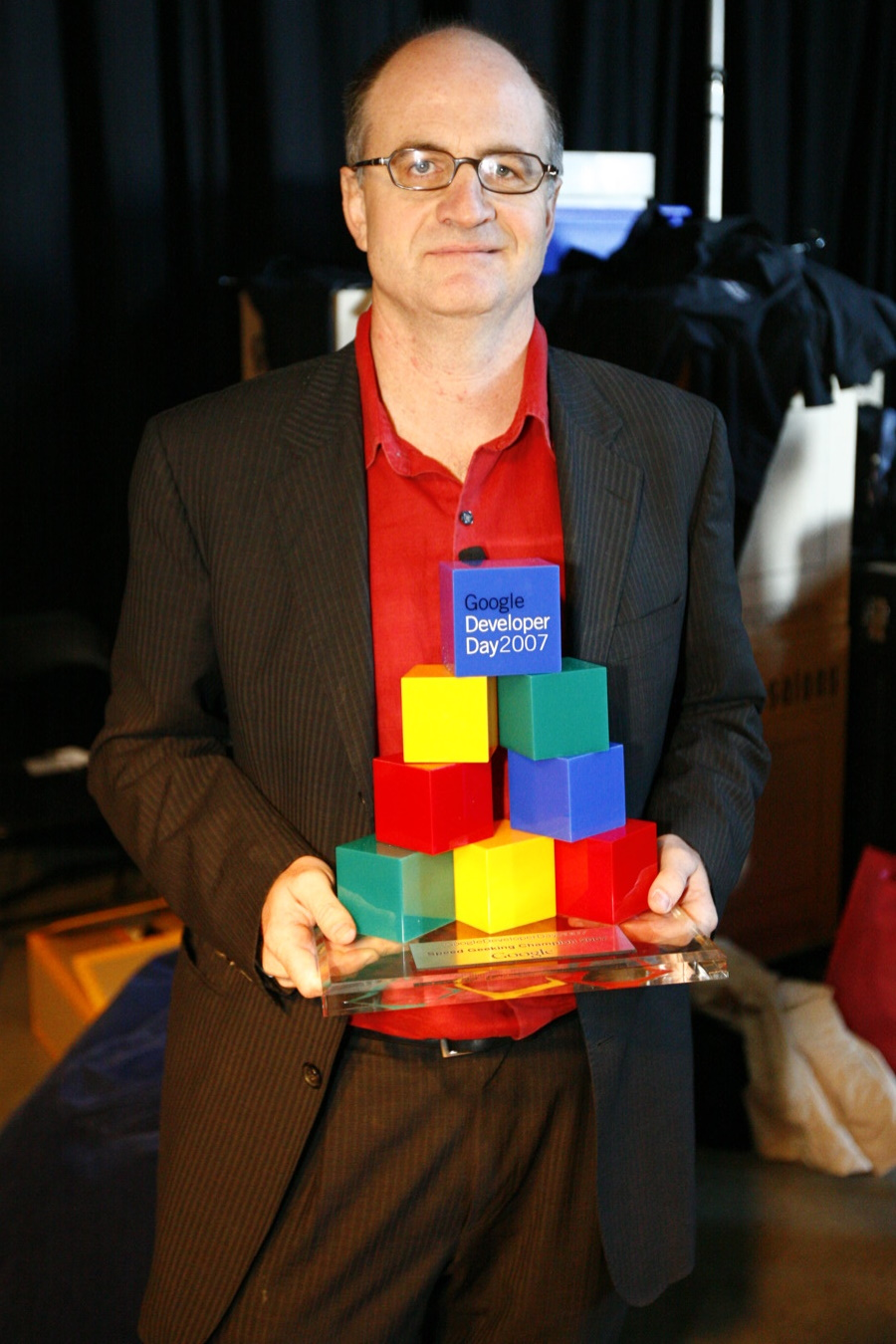
Host James O'Loghlin

== Episodes ==
Each invention was given time to present its use, economic viability, purpose and niche. The inventors were then queried by a panel of three judges, chosen for each program based on their speciality. The judges included agricultural scientist Chris Russell, CSIRO engineer James Bradfield Moody, designer Alison Page, futurist Mark Pesce, science broadcaster and microbiologist Bernie Hobbs, woodworker Richard Vaughan, designer and inventor Sally Dominguez, materials scientist Veena Sahajwalla, journalist and inventor Christine Kininmonth and inventor and plastic surgeon Dr Fiona Wood.

At the end of the show the three judges picked a winner, referencing the six criteria of the show: originality, need, safety, design, market and marketability, and manufacture and pricing. The winner of the episode was then in the running to appear in the annual grand final episode, and be named "Inventor of the Year" and join the ranks of the Hills Hoist and the fax machine in Australia's hall of fame of home-grown inventions. The public could vote by SMS or online for their favourite invention, which was then in the running for an annual People's Choice award.

== History ==
In the 1970s ABC broadcast The Inventors, produced by Beverly Gledhill. The new show was called The New Inventors. The very first episode of The New Inventors aired on 11 March 2004.

After 8 seasons, The New Inventors ended in 2011. The last episode aired on 17 August 2011 on ABC TV.
