= Downspout =

Pipe for carrying water from a rain gutter

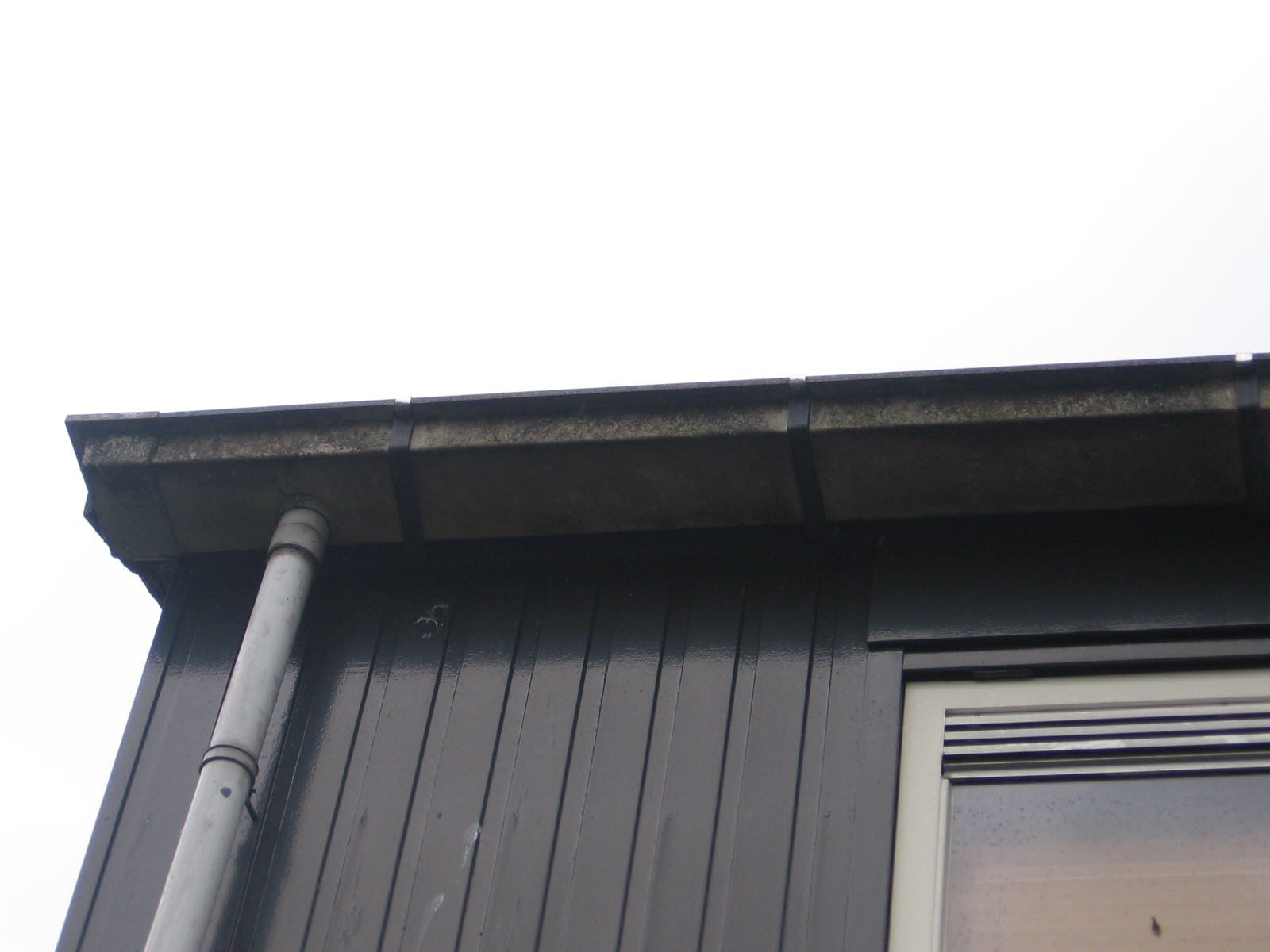
Rain gutter and downspout

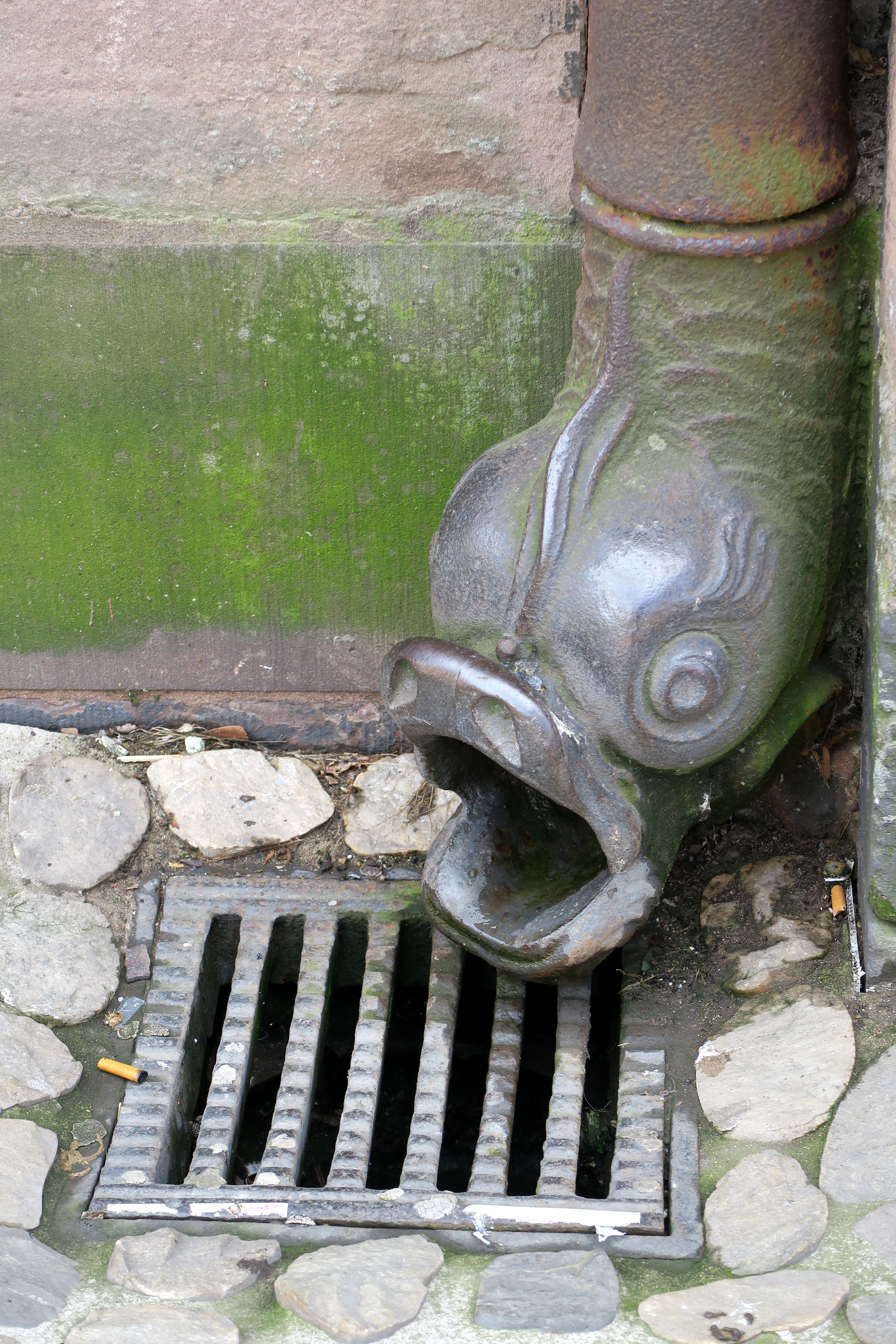
A downspout in Strasbourg Place du Chateau.

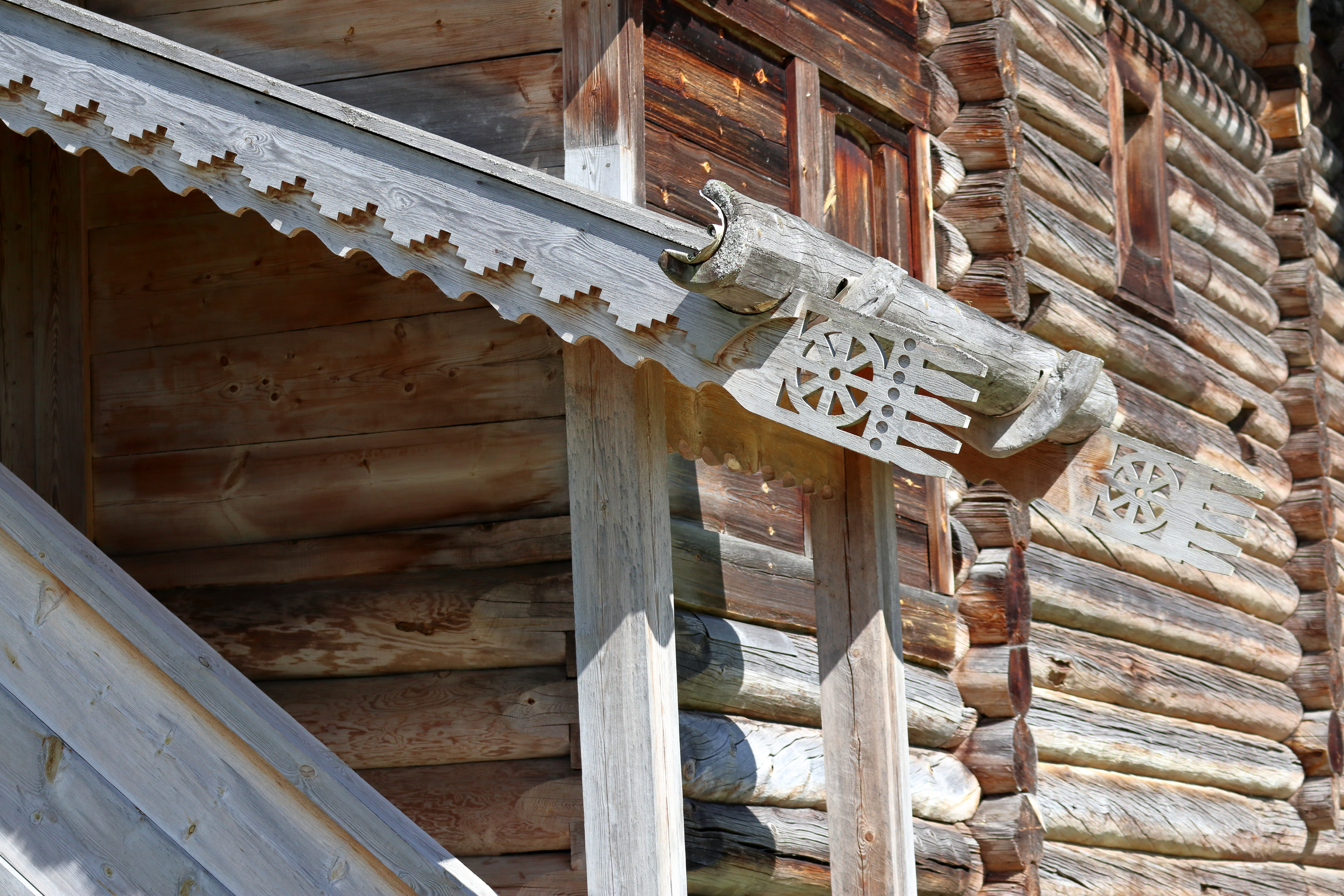
Wooden gutter, covered with birch bark (St. Nicholas Church, Vitoslavlicy, Russia - 1650 year)

A downspout, waterspout, downpipe, drain spout, drainpipe, roof drain pipe, rone or leader is a pipe for carrying rainwater from a rain gutter.

The purpose of a downspout is to allow water from a gutter to reach the ground without dripping or splashing down the building structure. Downspouts are usually vertical and usually extend down to ground level, although may be routed at an angle to avoid architectural features and may discharge onto an intermediate roof.

At the bottom of downspout there are typically features to divert discharged water away from the building's foundations to prevent water damage. This may be a simple bend of, typically around 70 degrees, at the bottom. Alternatively a downspout may lead to a sewer, a runoff water drain or a seepway to allow the water to soak into the ground through seepage.

Decorative heads are sometimes added, these being low-height gargoyles.

== See also ==
- Copper downspout
- Rain gutter
- Eaves
- Leader head
- Rain chain
- Rainwater harvesting
