= Sally Dominguez =

Australian designer

- Born: 24 October 1969 (age 57)
- Occupations: Designer and Inventor

Sally Dominguez (born 24 October 1969) is an Australian inventor and designer.

== Early life and education ==
Sally Dominguez was born in Australia on 24 October 1969. She attended the Sydney Church of England Grammar School – an all girls preparatory school located in Sydney, New South Wales, Australia – from 1978 to 1986 where she participated in school musicals, the orchestra, field hockey, and track & field.

From 1988 to 1993, she attended the University of Sydney where she received her bachelor's and master's degrees in architecture (science) and architecture. While at the University of Sydney, Dominguez was a writer and performer for the Sydney University architecture revue and the president of the Sydney University Windsurfing Club.

== Projects ==
From 2000 to 2008, she was the founder and creative director of BUG Design. While working with Susan Burns at BUG Design, Dominguez practiced sustainable architecture and eventually designed the award-winning Nest high chair. The Nest high chair is now held in the Permanent Collection of the Powerhouse Museum and has received numerous awards for its safe, practical, aesthetically pleasing design. Two additional products – the Nest low chair and Nuzzle cup holder table – were also designed to accompany the Nest high chair.

In 2004, she invented her most well-known innovation, a rainwater tank which could be used in either horizontal or vertical orientation, the modular Rainwater Hog. As a native Australian living in southern California, Dominguez claimed to be acquainted with the struggles of living in a dry climate. She invented the Rainwater Hog in order to provide rainwater storage systems to a wider variety of customer. In response to rainwater collection and storage systems being seen as large and expensive, Dominguez's modular design focused on accessibility and customizability for homes, businesses, and schools. The tanks are also UV-resistant, reusable, and can be discreetly installed vertically or horizontally; these features were intended to provide a reliable, customizable rainwater storage solution. Additionally, the manufacturer claims Rainwater Hog is safer than previously available options because it can not spill, tip, or spin, and it can withstand over twice the pressure of traditional rainwater storage barrels at the time.

Sally developed the Adventurous Thinking 10X Mindset, which is a strategy for innovation that relies on "bearable discomfort" and the five lens tool kit to reignite the curious mindset that is the key to consistent innovation. The Adventurous Thinking 10X Mindset program partners with Stanford University to teach the keys to consistent innovation. The program has been used by numerous Fortune500 companies, NASA, the Shenzhen Government, Clif Bar, and the Australian education system.

Since the start of COVID-19, Dominguez has focused on digitizing organizations and providing hybrid solutions focused on stimulating human connection and decentralized resilience. Dominguez currently spends the majority of her time lecturing on design for the Board of Studies DesignTech and freelance writing on design, product innovation and sustainability in design for Monument, G and Wheels magazine. In February, 2021, Dominguez released Epic Resilience, a book explaining the strategy for developing personal resilience and a growth mindset to not only survive but thrive in a world of constant change.

== Recognition and awards ==
Dominguez's Rainwater HOG modular tank was named one of the USA's Top 10 Green Building Products of 2008 and was awarded a Spark Design Award, also in 2008. Sally judges inventions on ABC TV's New Inventors. Other professional judging work includes the Wheels Car of the Year awards from 2005 until 2007 and the International Australian Design Award in 2008. Dominguez is a 2009 Spark Awards judge. In 2012, she was named one of Advance Australia's "50 for the Future" entrepreneurs in the USA. Dominguez was also selected as the sustainable resilience expert for IKEA's 2020 Life at Home Report.
