= I-bot =

The Microbric I-Bot is a small robot that was distributed as a build-it-yourself kit by the Adelaide Advertiser newspaper in South Australia in November-December 2005. It is designed to be used as an introduction to electronics and to teach robotics.

The I-Bot, now discontinued, was created by Microbric, manufactured by Tytronics, distributed by The Advertiser/Sunday Mail (Newspapers in Education) and supported by the Electronics Industry Association in Australia.

A community of I-Bot users has developed with the aid of internet forums.

== Programming ==
Programs can be created and uploaded to the I-Bot, via Windows and Mac software available from the I-Bot website. A simple graphical interface is used to create programs which can then be uploaded to the I-Bot via holding it up to a flashing square on the display.

The programmer requires internet access, but I-Bot programs can be shared with others using a 'shareId' number.

== Available programs ==
- 312 - Plays "We wish you a Merry Christmas" music (by Zetter)
- 318 - As 312, but with cycling lights (by Zetter)
- 341 - Reverse Parallel Park (by Jimbot)
- 480 - Plays "Can Can" music (by Joshua Bost)
- 714 - Take a Bow (by pschulz01)
- 748 - As 714, but with IR control (by pschulz01)
- 725 - Turn, Twist and Shake (by Aquaspoon)
- 847 - Timer Demonstration (by sgregory)
- 969 - Bump-n-go (by sgregory)
- 1188 - Play "Jingle Bells" music (by craig)
- 1274 - Play "Swan Lake" music (by brenton)
