= Magnetic shield =

Magnetic shield may refer to:

- Magnetic shielding, materials that re-direct magnetic fields
- Earth's magnetosphere
