= Copper in architecture =

Material for building and design

Exterior copper cladding on a modern building at Yifei Originality Street, one of Shanghai's art, cultural and entertainment centers.

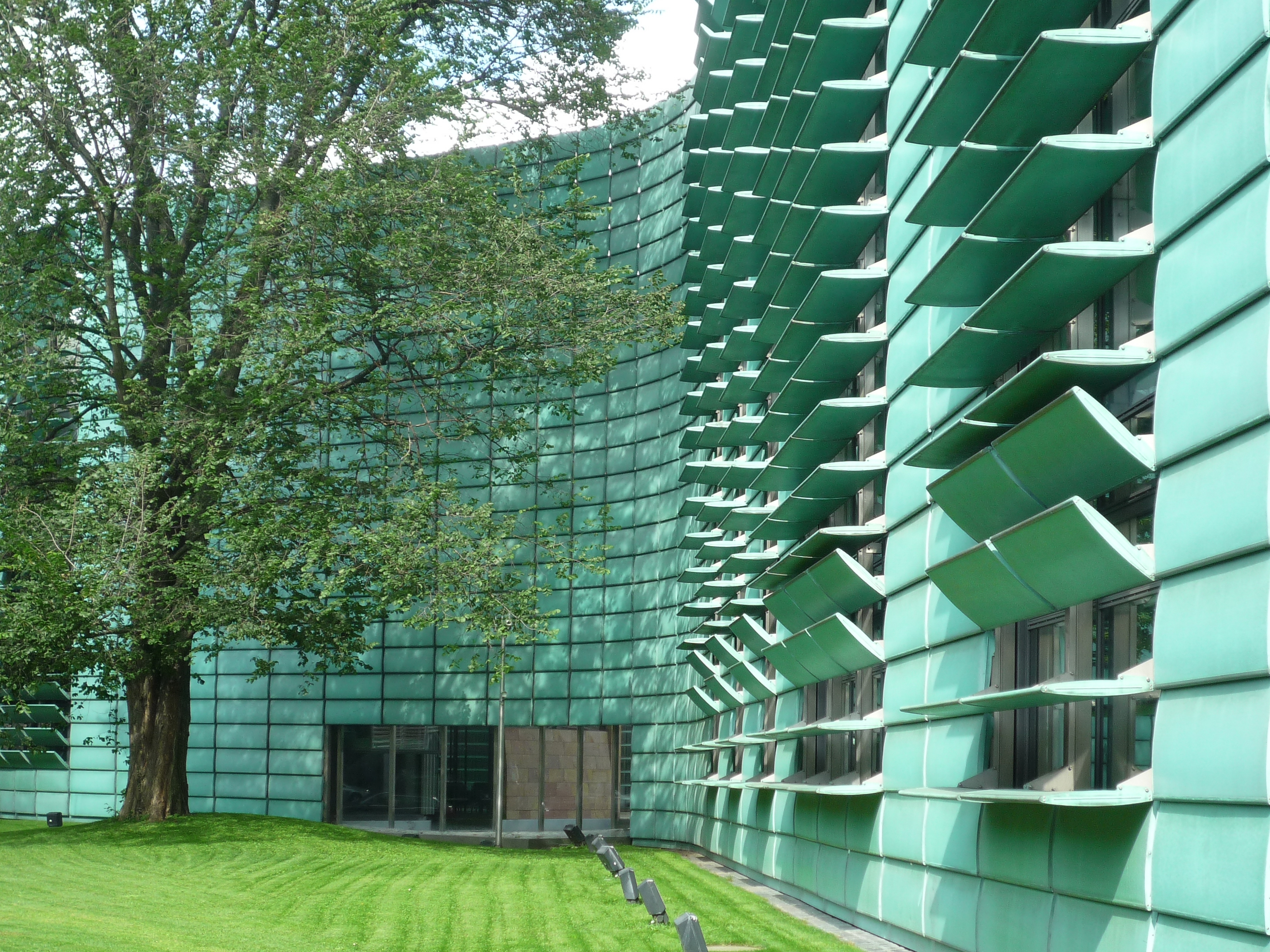
The Nordic Embassies, in Berlin, Germany.

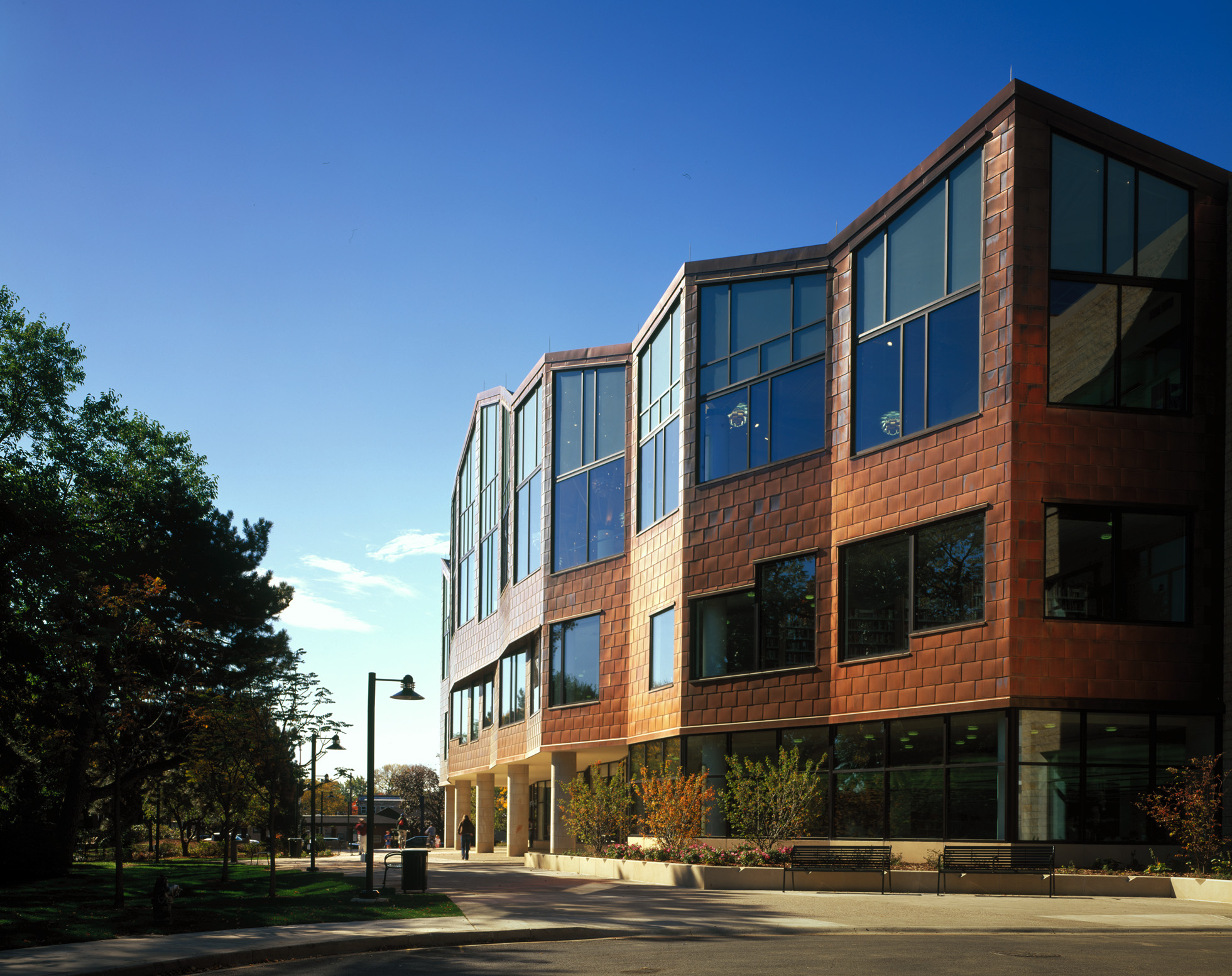
Copper facade at the Oak Park Public Library, U.S.

Engraving on architectural copper encasement at the Yin Ruins Museum, Anyang, North Henan Province, People's Republic of China.

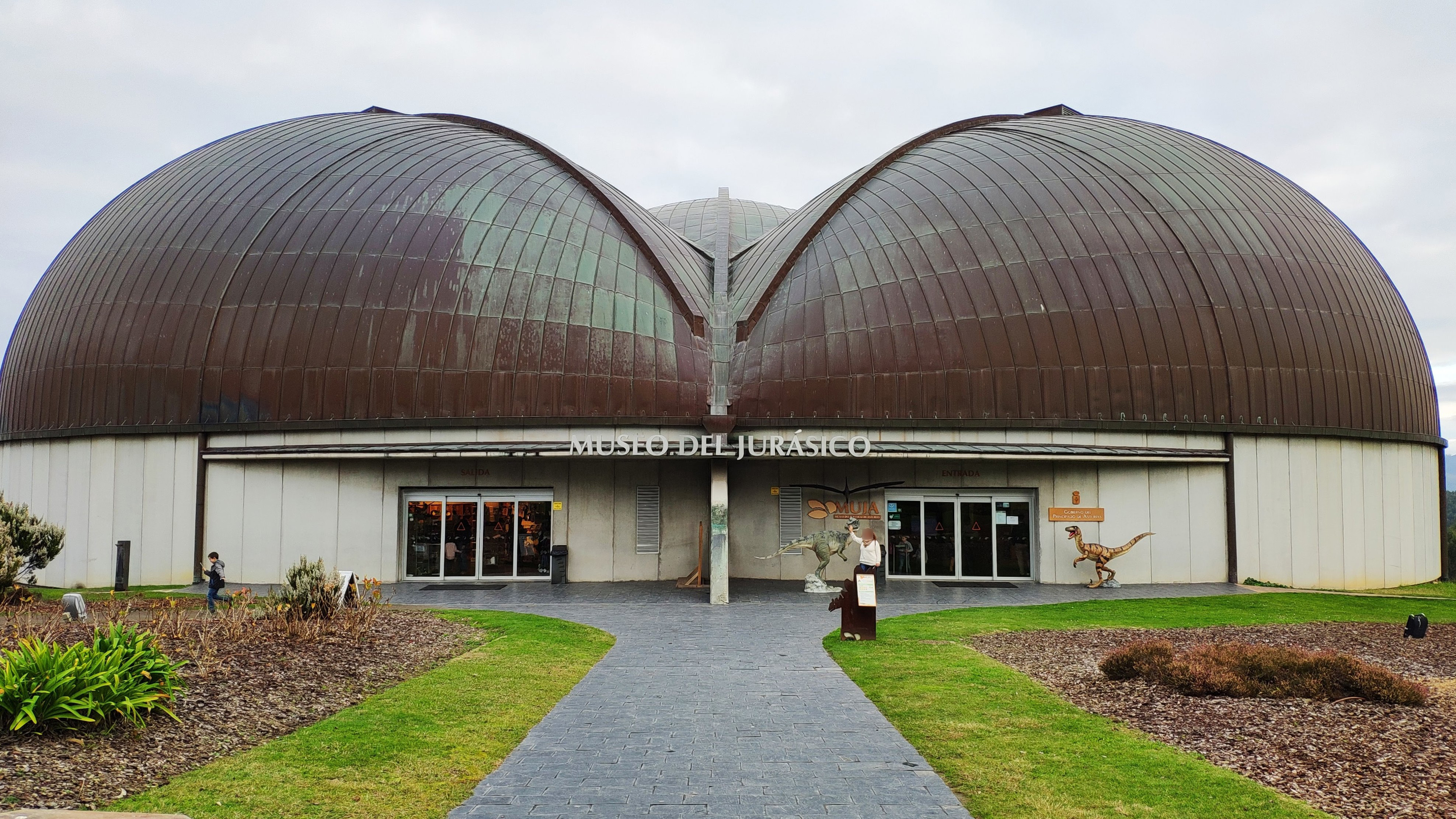
Jurassic Museum of Asturias (MUJA) in Spain, with three-lobed copper roof designed to resemble a dinosaur's foot.

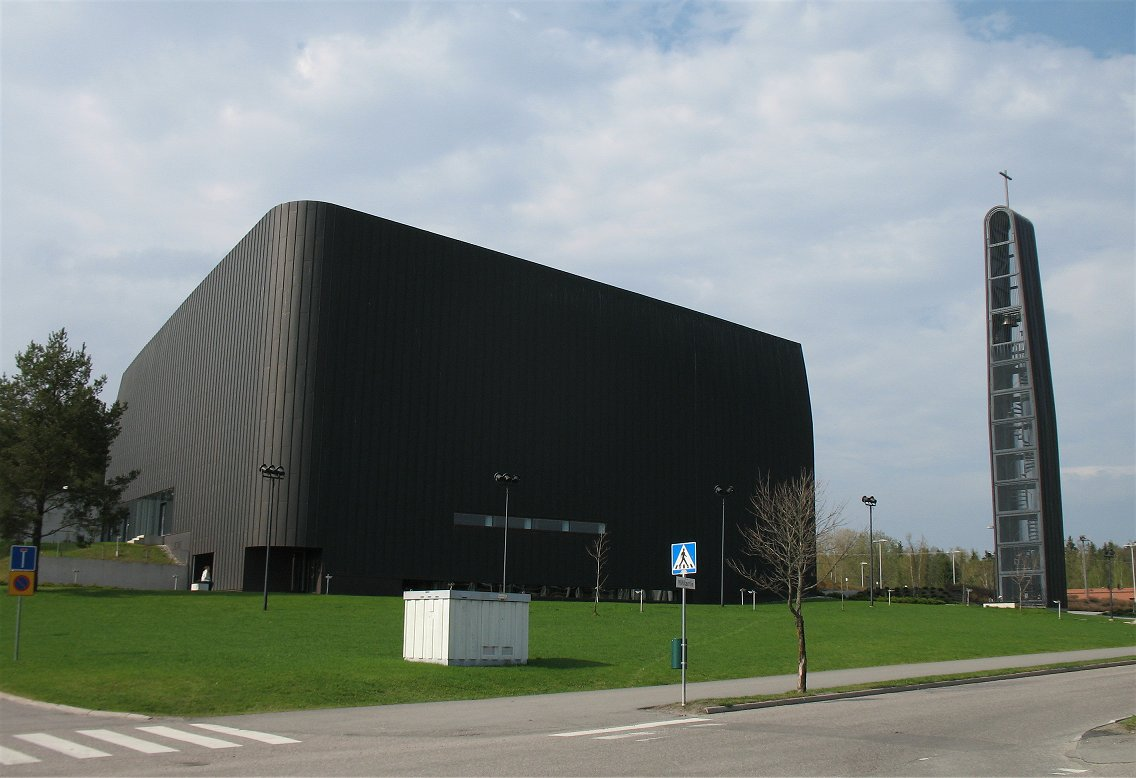
Klaukkala church in Klaukkala, Finland, mostly covered with machine-seamed copper sheets.

Copper is used in architecture, building construction, and interior design. From cathedrals to castles and from homes to offices, copper is used for a variety of architectural elements, including roofs, flashings, gutters, downspouts, domes, spires, vaults, wall cladding, and building expansion joints.

The history of copper in architecture can be linked to its durability, corrosion resistance, prestigious appearance, and ability to form complex shapes. For centuries, craftsmen and designers utilized these attributes to build aesthetically pleasing and long-lasting building systems.

For the past quarter century, copper has been designed into a much wider range of buildings, incorporating new styles, varieties of colors, and different shapes and textures. Copper clad walls are a modern design element in both indoor and outdoor environments.

Some of the world's most distinguished modern architects have relied on copper. Examples include Frank Lloyd Wright, who specified copper materials in all of his building projects; Michael Graves, an AIA Gold Medalist who designed over 350 buildings worldwide; Renzo Piano, who designed pre-patinated clad copper for the NEMO-Metropolis Museum of Science in Amsterdam; Malcolm Holzman, whose patinated copper shingles at the WCCO Television Communications Centre made the facility an architectural standout in Minneaoplis; and Marianne Dahlbäck and Göran Månsson, who designed the Vasa Museum, a prominent feature of Stockholm's skyline, with 12,000-square-meter (130,000 sq ft) copper cladding. Architect Frank O. Gehry's enormous copper fish sculpture atop the Vila Olimpica in Barcelona is an example of the artistic use of copper.

Copper's most noteworthy aesthetic trait is its range of hues, from a bright metallic colour to iridescent brown to near black and, finally, to a greenish verdigris patina. Architects describe the array of browns as russet, chocolate, plum, mahogany, and ebony. The metal's distinctive green patina has long been coveted by architects and designers.

This article describes practical and aesthetic benefits of copper in architecture as well as its use in exterior applications, interior design elements, and green buildings.

== History ==
Copper has played a role in architecture for thousands of years. In ancient Egypt, massive doors to the temple of Amen-Re at Karnak were clad with copper. In the 3rd Century B.C., copper roof shingles were installed atop of the Lowa Maha Paya Temple in Sri Lanka. The Romans used copper as roof covering for the Pantheon in 27 B.C.

Centuries later, copper and its alloys were integral in medieval architecture. The doors of the Church of the Nativity at Bethlehem (6th century) are covered with plates of bronze, cut out in patterns. Those of Hagia Sophia at Constantinople, of the 8th and 9th century, are wrought in bronze. Bronze doors on the Aachen Cathedral in Germany date back to about 800 A.D. Bronze baptistery doors at the Cathedral of Florence were completed in 1423 A.D. by Ghiberti.

The copper roof of Hildesheim Cathedral, installed in 1280 A.D., survives to this day. The roof at Kronborg, one of northern Europe's most important Renaissance castles that was immortalized as Elsinore Castle in Shakespeare's Hamlet, was installed in 1585 A.D. The copper on the tower was renovated in 2009.

For years, copper was reserved mainly for public institutions, such as churches, government buildings, and universities. Copper roofs are often one of the most architecturally distinguishable features of these structures.

In the 21st century, architectural copper is used in roofing systems, flashings and copings, rain gutters and downspouts, building expansion joints, wall cladding, domes, spires, vaults, and various other design elements. Simultaneously, the metal has evolved from a weather barrier and exterior design element into indoor building environments where it is changing the way commercial and residential interiors are decorated.

The use of copper continues to evolve in the indoor environment. Its recently proven antimicrobial properties reduce pathogenic bacterial loads on such products as handrails, bedrails, bathroom fixtures, counter tops, etc. These antimicrobial copper-based products are now being incorporated into public facilities (hospitals, nursing homes, mass transit facilities) as well as in residential buildings because of the public health benefits. (For main article, see: Antimicrobial copper-alloy touch surfaces.)

== Benefits ==
=== Corrosion resistance ===
As an architectural metal, copper provides excellent corrosion resistance. Copper surfaces form tough oxide-sulfate patina coatings that protect underlying copper surfaces and resist corrosion for a very long time.

Copper corrodes at negligible rates in unpolluted air, water, de-aerated non-oxidizing acids, and when exposed to saline solutions, alkaline solutions, and organic chemicals. Copper roofing in rural atmospheres corrodes at rates of less than 0.4 mm (1/64 in) in 200 years.

Unlike most other metals, copper does not suffer from underside corrosion that can cause premature failures in roofing. With a copper roof, supporting substrates and structures usually fail long before the copper on the roof.

Architectural copper is, however, susceptible to corrosive attack under certain conditions. Oxidizing acids, oxidizing heavy-metal salts, alkalis, sulfur and nitrogen oxides, ammonia, and some sulfur and ammonium compounds can expedite copper corrosion. Precipitation in areas with a pH less than 5.5 may corrode copper, possibly before a patina or protective oxide film has the time to form. Acidic precipitation, known as acid rain, is due to emissions from fossil fuel combustion, chemical manufacturing, or other processes that release sulfur and nitrogen oxides into the atmosphere. Erosion corrosion may occur when acidic water from a non-copper roof that does not neutralise the acidity, such as tile, slate, wood, or asphalt, falls on a small area of copper. Line corrosion can occur if the drip edge of an inert roofing material rests directly on copper. A solution to this may be to raise the lower edge of the shingles with a cant strip, or to provide a replaceable reinforcing strip between the shingles and the copper. Proper water-shedding design and detailing, which reduces the dwell time of acidic water on metal surfaces, can prevent the majority of atmospheric corrosion problems.

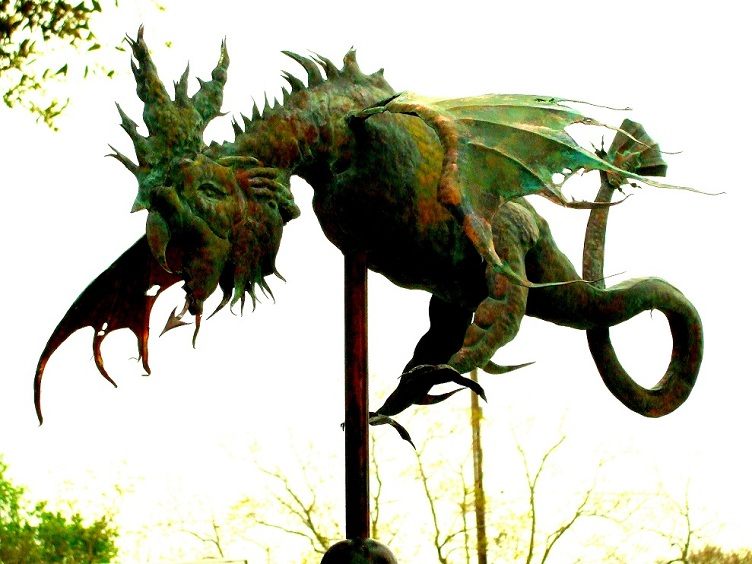
A copper weather vane as an architectural element

Brass, an alloy of copper and zinc, has good resistance to atmospheric corrosion, alkalis, and organic acids. In some potable waters and in seawater, however, brass alloys with 20% or more zinc may suffer corrosive attack.

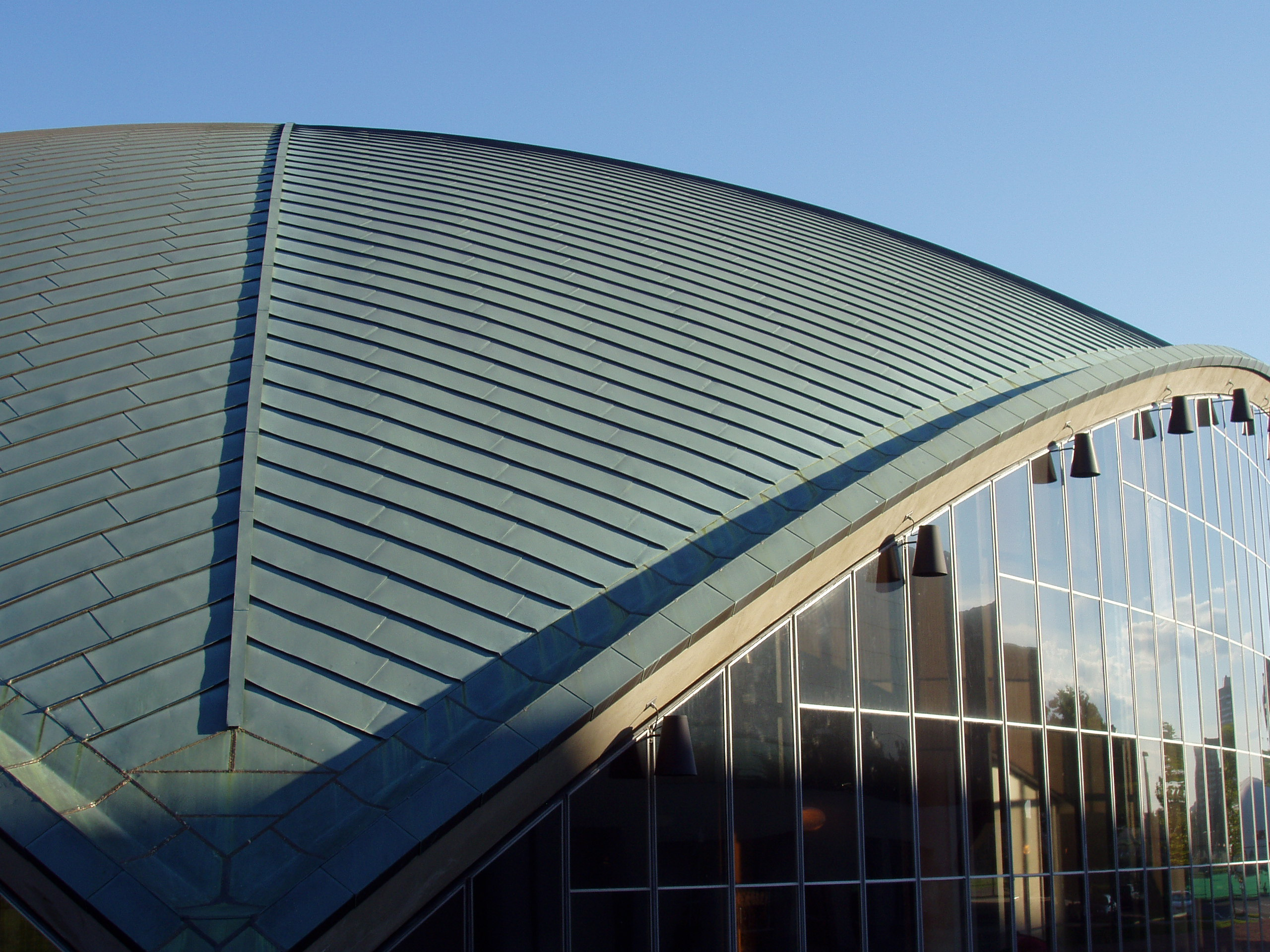
Detail of roofline at Kresge Auditorium, Massachusetts Institute of Technology, in the U.S.

=== Durability/long-life ===
Copper roofs are extremely durable in most environments. They have performed well for over 700 years, primarily because of the protective patina that forms on copper surfaces. Tests conducted on 18th Century copper roofs in Europe showed that, in theory, they could last for one thousand years.

=== Low thermal movement ===
Properly designed copper roofs minimize movements due to thermal changes. Copper's low thermal expansion, 40% less than zinc and lead, helps to prevent deterioration and failure. Also, copper's high melting point ensures that it will not creep or stretch as some other metals do.

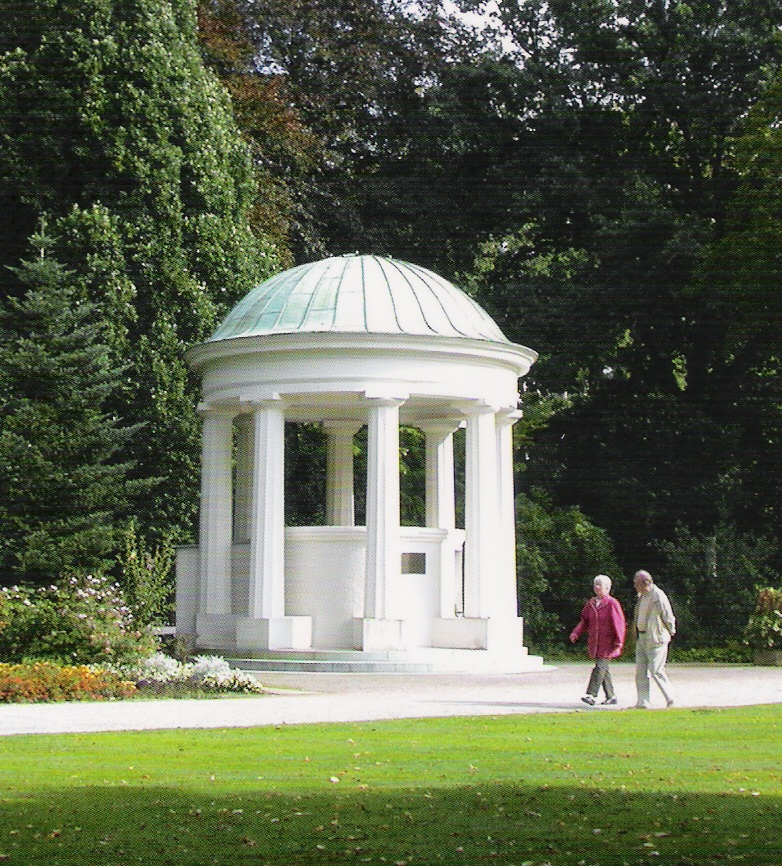

On small gable roofs, thermal movement is relatively minor and usually is not an issue. On wide-span buildings over 60 m (200 ft) and when long panels are used, an allowance for thermal expansion may be necessary. This enables the roof to "float" over supporting substructures while remaining secure.

=== Low maintenance ===
Copper does not require cleaning or maintenance. It is particularly suited for areas that are difficult or dangerous to access after installation.

=== Lightweight ===
When used as a fully supported roof covering, copper is half the weight (including substrate) of lead and only a quarter of tiled roofs. This generally provides savings in supporting structure and materials costs. Copper cladding offers additional opportunities to reduce the weight of copper structures (For more details, see: Copper cladding and Wall cladding).

=== Ventilation ===
Copper does not require complex ventilation measures. It is suitable for both unventilated 'warm' and ventilated 'cold' roof constructions.

=== Radio frequency shielding ===
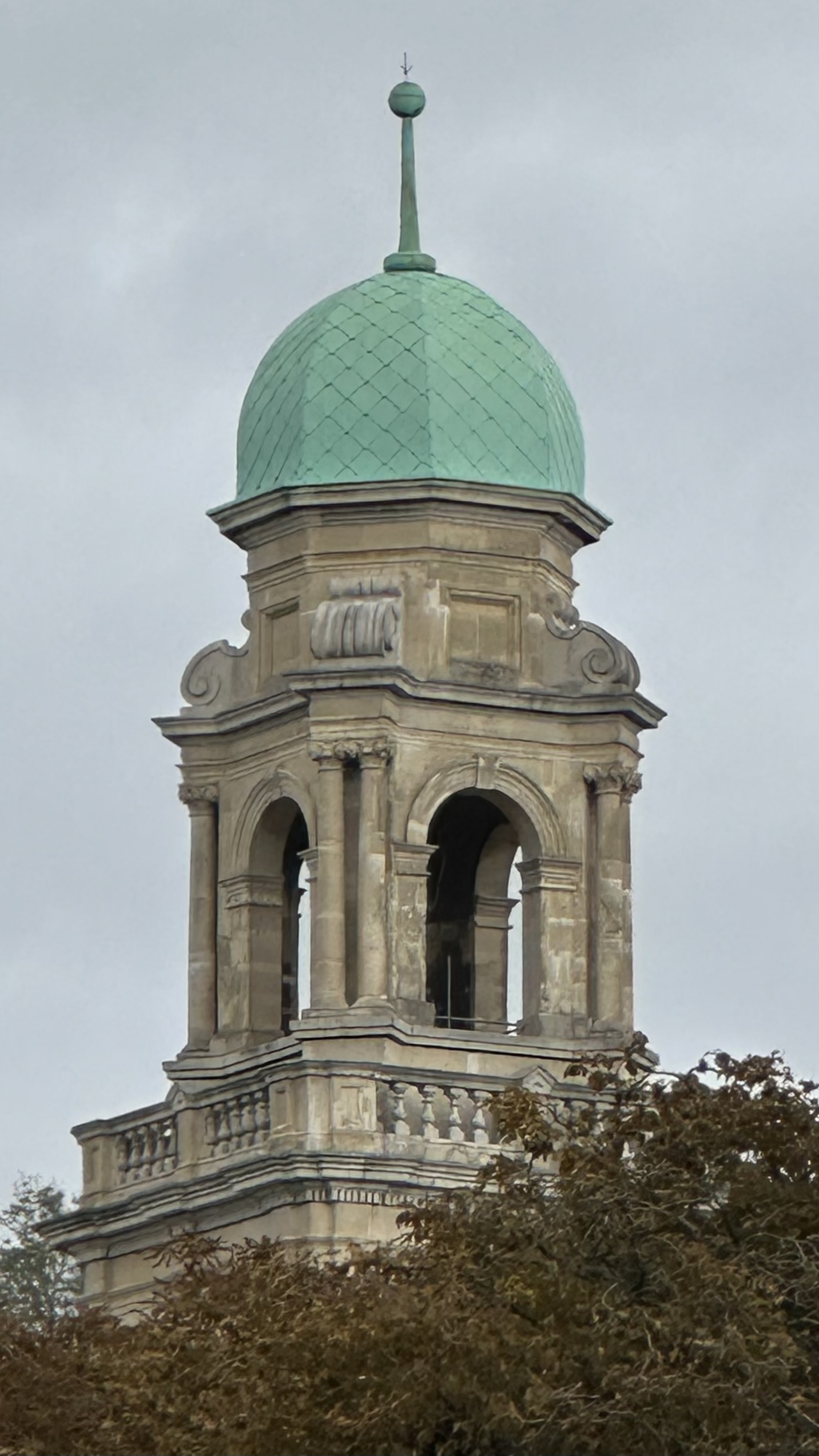
Copper dome on stone tower of Chatham Town Hall, Kent, England

Sensitive electronic equipment are vulnerable to interference and unauthorized surveillance. These products also require protection from high voltages. Radio frequency (RF) shielding can address these issues by reducing the transmission of electric or magnetic fields from one space to another.

Copper is an excellent material for RF shielding because it absorbs radio and magnetic waves. Other useful properties for RF shielding is that copper has a high electrical conductivity, is ductile, malleable, and solders easily.

RF shielding enclosures filter a range of frequencies for specific conditions. Properly designed and constructed copper enclosures satisfy most RF shielding needs, from computer and electrical switching rooms to hospital CAT-scan and MRI facilities. Special attention needs to be addressed regarding potential shield penetrations, such as doors, vents, and cables.

A shield can be effective against one type of electromagnetic field but not against another. For example, a copper foil or screen RF shield will be minimally effective against power frequency magnetic fields. A power frequency magnetic shield could offer little reduction of radio frequency fields. The same is true for different RF frequencies. A simple large-mesh screen shield can work well for lower frequencies, but can be ineffective for microwaves.

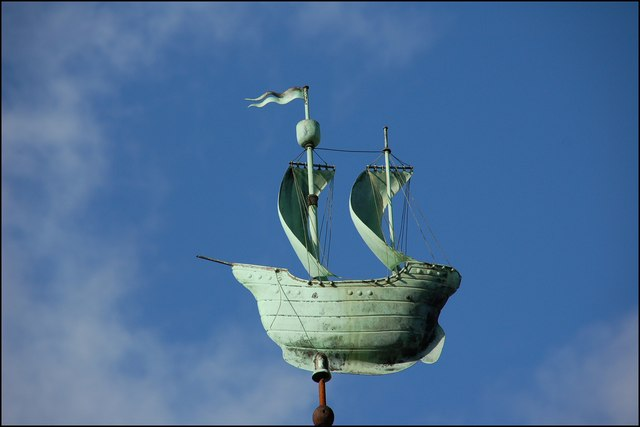
Copper galleon finial.

Sheet copper for RF shielding can be formed into essentially any shape and size. Electrical connection to a grounding system provides an effective RF enclosure.

=== Lightning protection ===
Lightning strike protection minimizes damage to buildings during lightning terminations. This is usually accomplished by providing multiple interconnected pathways of low electrical impedance to the ground.

Copper and its alloys are the most common materials used in residential lightning protections, however in industrial, chemically corrosive environments, the copper may need to be clad in tin. Copper effectively facilitates the transmission of lightning energy to the ground because of its excellent electrical conductivity. Also, it bends easily compared to other conductor materials.

When copper roofing, gutters, and rain leaders are electrically bonded to an earth termination facility, a pathway of low electrical impedance to ground is provided, however without dedicated conduction pathways to concentrate the discharge channel, a disperse energized surface may not be the most desirable.

Because copper has a higher electrical conductivity than aluminium and its impedance during a lightning termination is less, copper allows for the use of less cross-sectional surface area per linear length, in its woven wires pathway than does aluminum. Also, aluminium cannot be used in poured concrete or for any component underground due to its galvanic properties.

To be effective, lightning protection systems generally maximize the surface area contact between the conductors and the earth through a ground grid of varying designs. To supplement grounding grids in low-conductivity earth, such as sand or rock, long, hollow copper tubes filled with metallic salts are available. These salts leach through holes in the tube, making the surrounding soil more conductive as well as increasing the overall surface area which decreases effective resistance.

Copper roofs may be used as part of a lightning protection scheme where the copper skin, gutters and rainwater pipes can be linked and bonded to an earth termination facility. The thickness of copper specified for roofing materials is usually adequate for lightning protection. A dedicated lightning protection system may be recommended to adequate lightning protection with an installed copper roof system. The system would include air terminals and intercepting conductors on the roof, a system of ground electrodes, and a system of down-conductors connecting the roof and ground components. It is recommended that the copper roof be bonded to the system of conductors. Bonding ensures that the conductors and roof remain at equipotential and reduce side flashing and possible roof damage.

=== Wide range of finishes ===
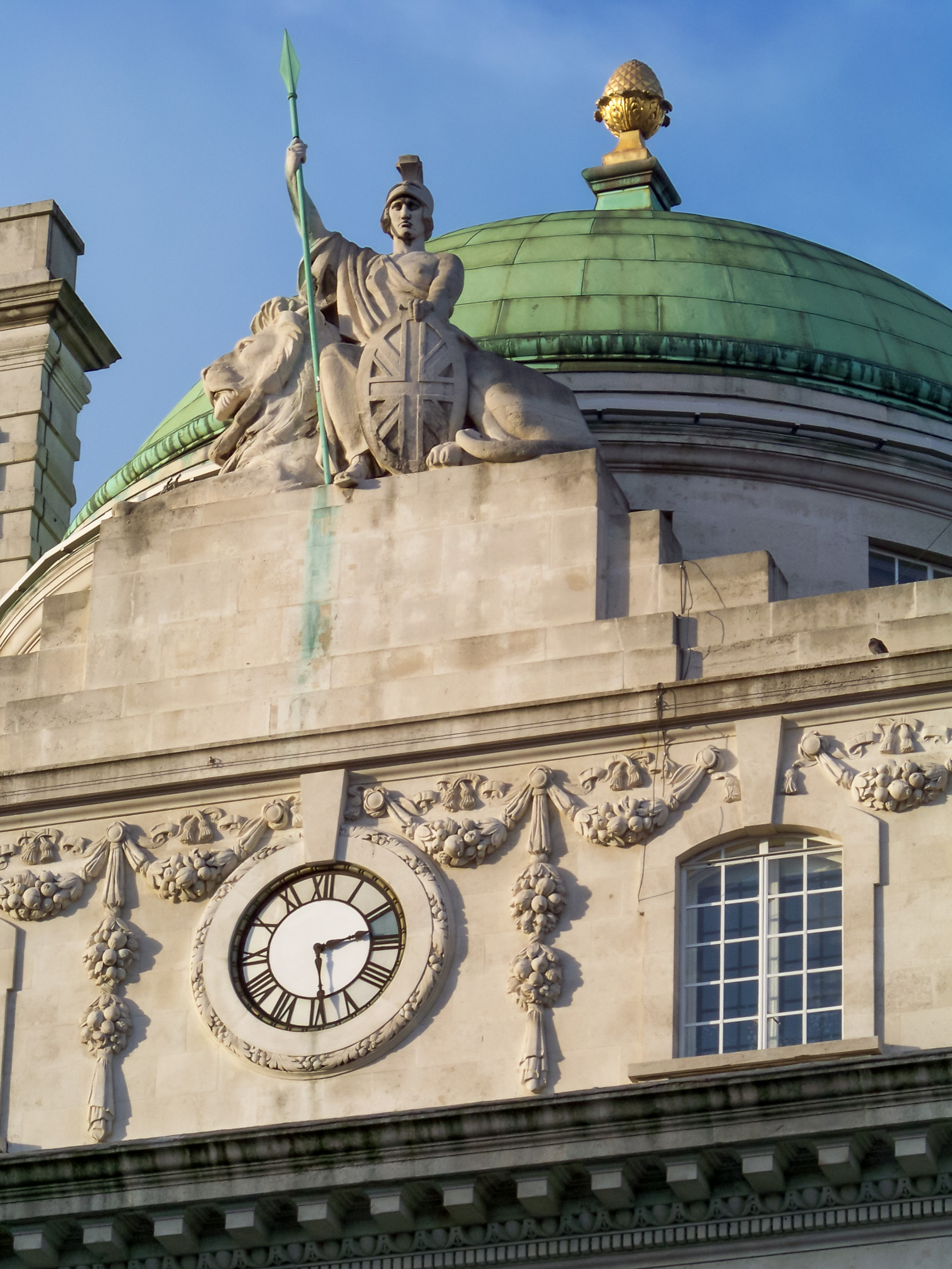
Green dome on the roof of the building County Fire Office in London

It is sometimes desirable to chemically alter the surface of copper or copper alloys to create a different color. The most common colors produced are brown or statuary finishes for brass or bronze and green or patina finishes for copper. Mechanical surface treatments, chemical coloring, and coatings are described elsewhere in this article at: Finishes.

=== Design continuity ===
Architects often look to architectural copper for continuity in design elements. For example, a copper roofing system may be designed with copper flashings, weatherings, vents, gutters, and downpipes. Cover details may include cornices, moldings, finials and sculptures.

With the growing use of vertical cladding, vertical and roofing surfaces can run into each other so that complete continuity of material and performance is maintained. Rain screens and curtain walling (often linked with transoms and mullions) are also gaining popularity in modern architectural design.

=== Antimicrobial ===
Extensive worldwide tests have proved that uncoated copper and copper alloys (e.g., brass, bronze, copper nickel, copper-nickel-zinc) have strong intrinsic antimicrobial properties with efficacies against a wide range of disease-resistant bacteria, molds, fungi and viruses. After years of testing, the U.S. approved the registration of over 300 different copper alloys (copper, brasses, bronzes, copper-nickels, and nickel-silvers) as antimicrobial materials. These developments are creating markets for antimicrobial copper and copper alloys in interior architecture. To meet the design needs for building surfaces, structures, fixtures, and components, antimicrobial copper-based products are available in a wide range of colors, finishes, and mechanical properties. Copper handrails, counter tops, hallways, doors, push plates, kitchens, and bathrooms are just some of the antimicrobial products approved for hospitals, airports, offices, schools, and army barracks to kill harmful bacteria. See: a list of products approved in the U.S.

=== Sustainability ===
While a universally accepted definition of sustainability remains elusive, the Brundtland Commission of the United Nations defined sustainable development as development that meets the needs of the present without compromising the ability of future generations to meet their own needs. Sustainability, the long-term maintenance of responsibility, requires the reconciliation of environmental, social equity and economic demands. These "three pillars" of sustainability encompass the responsible management of resource use. Also, it can mean that we can use a resource which won't cease to be abundant despite increasing intake.

Copper is a sustainable material. Its durability offers service for a long time. Its high electrical and thermal energy efficiencies reduce the waste of electrical energy. Its antimicrobial properties destroy pathogenic microorganisms that can cause disease. And its high scrap value and ability to be continuously recycled without any loss in performance ensure its responsible management as a resource.

Life cycle inventory (LCI) information on copper tube, sheet, and wire products, using ISO standards and covering the mining and primary copper production sectors (i.e., smelting and refining) is available. Used in life cycle assessments (LCAs), particularly in the building and construction sector, LCI datasets assist manufacturers of copper-containing products with compliance and voluntary improvement initiatives. They also support policy makers in the development of environmental guidelines and regulations with the aim of fostering sustainable development.

The long lifetime of copper roofing and cladding has a significant positive effect on whole life assessments of copper versus other materials in terms of embodied energy consumption (i.e., the total energy consumed during every phase of each lifecycle in MJ/m^{2}), CO_{2} generation, and cost.

Comparison of lifespan, embodied energy, and embodied CO_{2} emissions of copper, stainless steel, and aluminium in roofing and cladding materials. (Source: German Ministry for Environmental Affairs, 2004)
	Copper	Stainless steel	Aluminium
Typical thicknesses (mm)	0.6	0.4	0.7
Lifespan (years)	200	100	100
Embodied Energy (MJ/m^{2})	103.3	157.2	115.4
CO_{2} equivalent emissions (kg/m^{2})	6.6	10.9	7.5

=== Recyclability ===
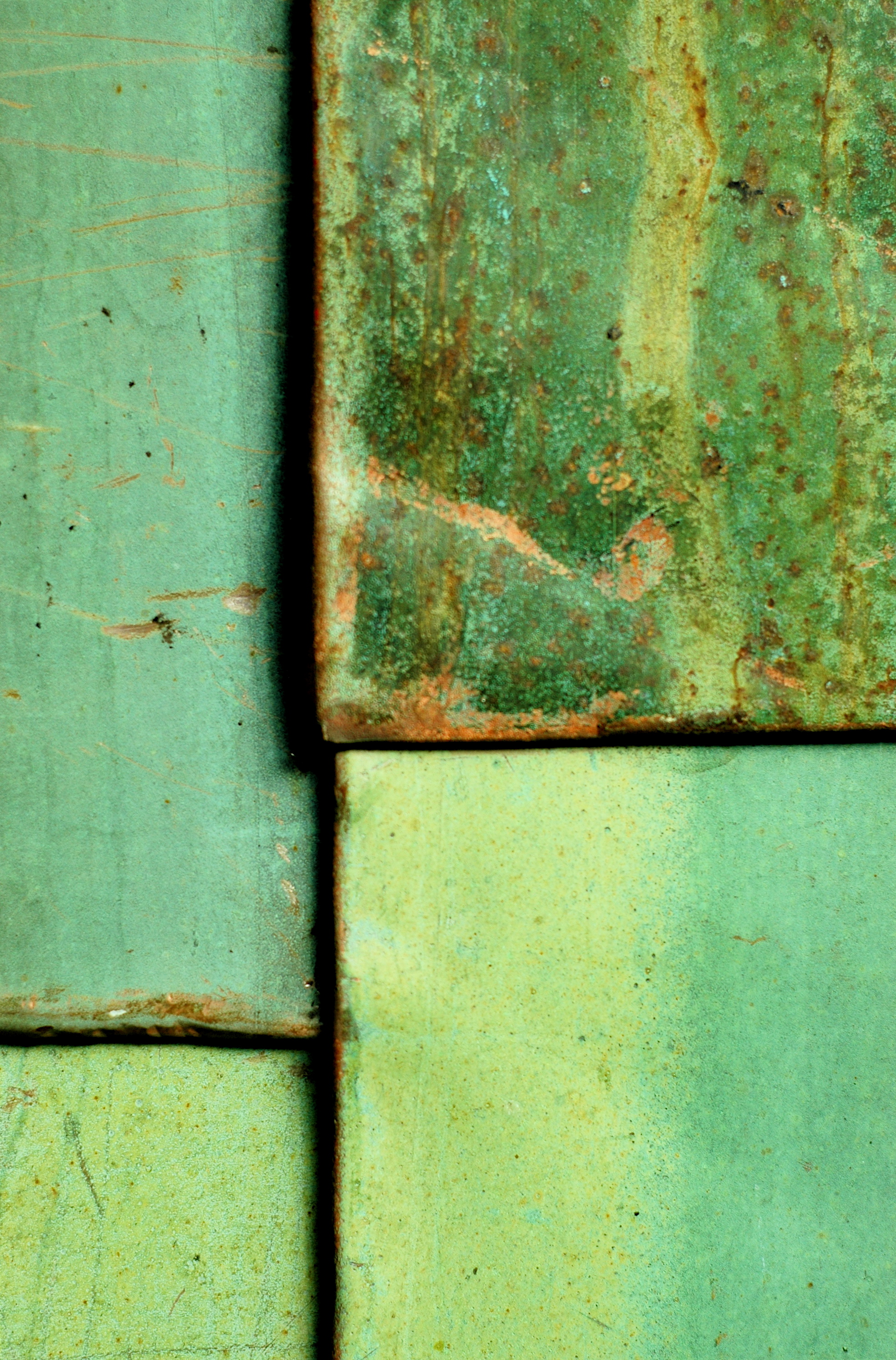
Copper paneling in the Canadian War Museum was recycled from the old roof of the Parliament in Ottawa.

Recyclability is a key factor of a sustainable material. It reduces the need to mine new resources and requires less energy than mining. Copper and its alloys are virtually 100% recyclable and can be recycled infinitely without any loss of quality (i.e., copper does not degrade (i.e., downcycle) after each recycling loop as do most non-metallic materials, if they are recyclable at all). Copper retains much of its primary metal value: premium-grade scrap normally contains at least 95% of the value of primary metal from newly mined ore. Scrap values for competing materials range from about 60% down to 0%. And copper recycling requires only around 20% of the energy needed to extract and process primary metal.

Currently, around 40% of Europe's annual copper demand and about 55% of copper used in architecture come from recycled sources. New copper coil and sheet often have 75%-100% recycled content.

By 1985, more copper was recycled than the total amount of copper that was consumed in 1950. This is due to the relative ease of reusing processing waste and salvaging copper from products after their useful life.

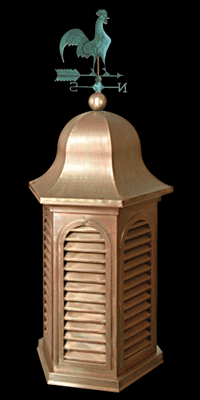
Six-sided copper cupola with copper finial and copper rooster weather vane mounted on top

.

=== Cost effectiveness ===
Performance, maintenance, service life, and recovery costs from recycling are factors that determine the cost effectiveness of building components. While copper's initial cost is higher than some other architectural metals, it usually does not need to be replaced during the life of a building. Due to its durability, low maintenance, and ultimate salvage value, the additional cost for copper may be insignificant over the life of a roofing system.

Copper roofing is considerably less expensive than lead, slate, or hand-made clay tiles. Its costs are comparable with zinc, stainless steel, aluminium and even some clay and concrete tiles when considering overall roofing costs (including structure).

Some studies indicate that copper is a more cost-effective material on a life cycle basis than other roof materials with a lifetime of 30 years or more. A European study comparing roofing costs of copper with other metals, concrete and clay tiles, slate, and bitumen found that in the medium to long-term (for lives of 60 to 80 years and 100 years and over), copper and stainless steel were the most cost effective roofing materials of all materials examined.

Installation techniques such as prefabrication, in-situ machine forming, mechanized seaming, and the long-strip system help to reduce the installation costs of copper roofing. By lowering installation costs, these techniques permit designers to specify copper into a wider array of building types, not just large prestigious projects as had been common in the past.

Since scrap copper retains much of its primary value, copper's life cycle costs are reduced when accounting for its salvage value. For more information, see Recyclability section in this article.

== Pure vis-à-vis alloyed copper ==
Pure copper. Unlike other metals, copper is frequently used in its pure (99.9% Cu) unalloyed form for sheet and strip applications in roofing, exterior cladding, and flashing.

Tempering is a heat treatment technique used to increase the toughness of metals. Tempers determine the ductility of the metal, and therefore how well it forms and will hold its shape without additional support. In the U.S., copper is available in six tempers: 060 soft, 1/8 hard cold rolled, 1/4 cold rolled high yield, half hard, three quarter hard, and hard. In the U.K., only three designations exist: soft, half-hard, and hard. Copper and its alloys are defined in the U.S. in Standard Designations for Copper and Copper Alloys by ASTM; in Europe by BS EN 1172: 1997 - 'Copper and Copper Alloys in Europe'; and in the U.K. by the British Standard Code of Practice CP143: Part12: 1970.

Cold rolled copper temper is by far the most popular in building construction in the U.S. It is less malleable than soft copper but is far stronger. Cold rolled 1/8 hard tempered copper is often recommended for roofing and flashing installations. Roof sheets with higher tempers may be specified for certain applications.

Soft tempered copper is extremely malleable and offers far less resistance than cold rolled copper to the stresses induced by expansion and contraction. It is used for intricate ornamental work and where extreme forming is required, such as in complicated thru-wall flashing conditions.

The major use for high-yield copper is in flashing products, where malleability and strength are both important.

The thickness of sheet and strip copper is measured in the U.S. by its weight in ounces per square foot. Thicknesses commonly used in construction in the U.S. are between 12 ounces (340 g) and 48 ounces (1,400 g). Since the industry often uses gauge numbers or actual thicknesses for sheet metal or other building materials, it is necessary to convert between the different measurement systems.

In Europe, phosphorus de-oxidized non-arsenical copper is used with the designation C106. The copper is rolled to thicknesses ranging between 0.5 and 1.0 mm (1/64 and 3/64 in) (1.5–3.0 mm or 1/16–1/8 in for curtain walling) but a 0.6–0.7 mm (3/128–1/32 in) thickness is usually used for roofing.

Alloyed copper. Copper alloys, such as brass and bronze, are also used in residential and commercial building structures. Variations in color stem primarily from differences in the alloy chemical composition.

Some of the more popular copper alloys and their associated Unified Numbering System (UNS) numbers developed by ASTM and SAE are as follows:

Colors of copper and various copper alloys used in building structures.

Copper alloy	Common term	Composition	Natural color	Weathered color
C11000 / C12500	Copper	99.90% copper	Salmon red	Reddish-brown to gray-green patina
C12200	Copper	99.90% copper; 0.02% phosphorus	Salmon red	Reddish-brown to gray-green patina
C22000	Commercial bronze	90% copper; 10% zinc	Red gold	Brown to gray-green patina in six years
C23000	Red brass	85% copper; 15% zinc	Reddish yellow	Chocolate brown to gray-green patina
C26000	Cartridge brass	70% copper; 30% zinc	Yellow	Yellowish, gray-green
C28000	Muntz metal	60% copper; 40% zinc	Reddish yellow	Red-brown to gray-brown
C38500	Architectural bronze	57% copper; 3% lead; 40% zinc	Reddish yellow	Russet brown to dark brown
C65500	Silicon bronze	97% copper; 3% silicon	Reddish old gold	Russet brown to finely mottled gray-brown
C74500	Nickel silver	65% copper; 25% zinc; 10% nickel	Warm silver	Gray-brown to finely mottled gray-green
C79600	Leaded nickel silver	45% copper; 42% zinc; 10% nickel; 2% manganese; 1% lead	Warm silver	Gray-brown to finely mottled gray-green

In practice, the term 'bronze' may be used for a variety of copper alloys with little or no tin if they resemble true bronzes in color.

Further information on architectural copper alloys is available.

== Selection criteria ==
The criteria by which copper and copper alloys are selected for architectural projects include color, strength, hardness, resistance to fatigue and corrosion, electrical and thermal conductivity, and ease of fabrication. Appropriate thicknesses and tempers for specific applications are essential; substitutions can lead to inadequate performance.

Architectural copper is generally used in sheet and strip. Strip is 60 cm (24 inches) or less in width, while sheet is over 60 cm (24 inches) in width, up to 120 cm (48 inches) in width by 240 or 300 cm (96 or 120 inches) in length, plus in coil form.

== Structural considerations ==
Structural considerations play an important role in the proper design of copper applications. The primary concern is about thermal effects: movement and stresses related to temperature variations. Thermal effects can be accommodated by preventing movement and resisting cumulative stresses or by allowing movement at predetermined locations, thereby relieving anticipated thermal stresses.

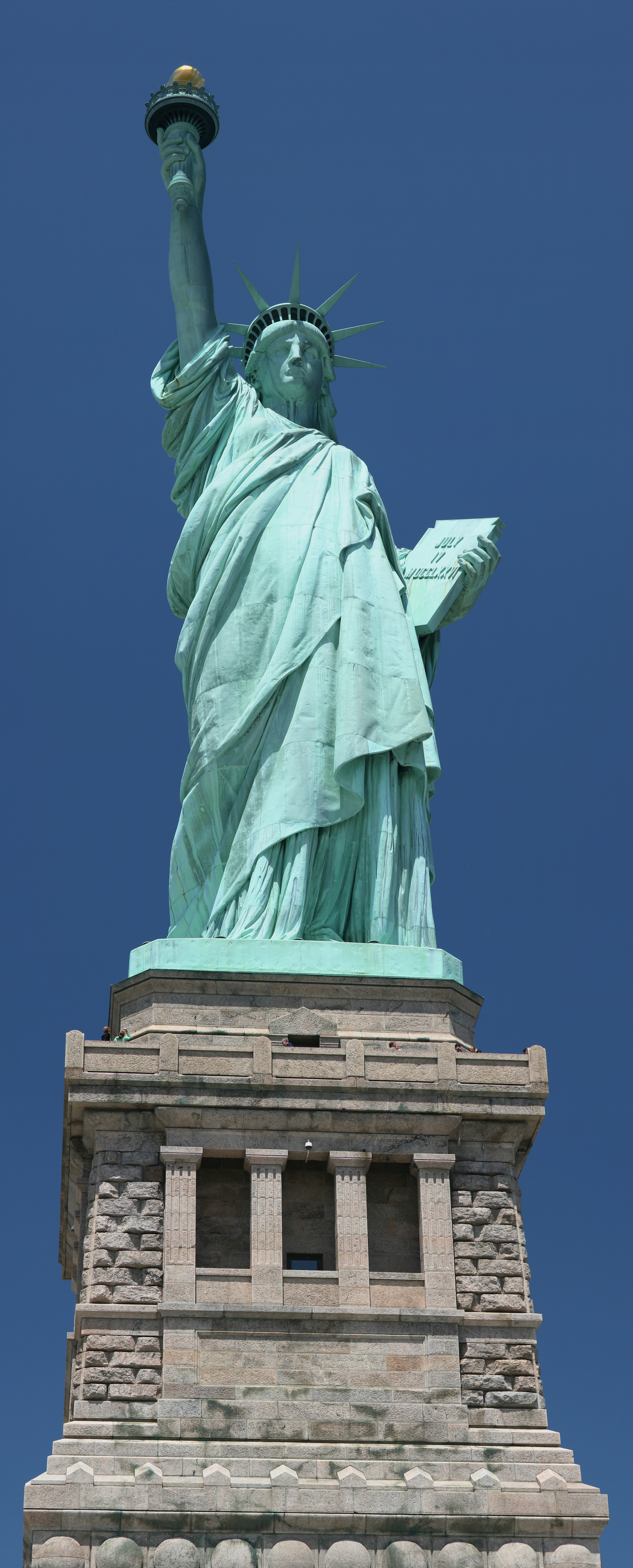
New York City's Statue of Liberty has 80 tonnes (88 short tons) of copper sheeting.

Wind resistance is an important structural consideration. Underwriters Laboratories (UL) conducted a series of tests on copper roof systems. A copper standing-seam roof with 10-by-10-foot (3 m × 3 m) test panels was subjected to the UL 580, Uplift Resistance Test Protocol. The copper system did not exhibit unusual deformation, the cleats did not loosen from the structural deck, and the system passed UL 580 requirements. UL-90 designation was granted.

== Joining ==
Copper and its alloys are readily joined by mechanical techniques, such as crimping, staking, riveting, and bolting; or by bonding techniques, such as soldering, brazing and welding. Selection of the best joining technique is determined by service requirements, joint configuration, thickness of components, and alloy composition.

Soldering is the preferred joining method where strong, watertight joints are required, such as for internal gutters, roofing, and flashing applications. A soldered seam joins two pieces of copper into a cohesive unit that expands and contracts as one piece. Well-soldered seams are often stronger than the original base material and provide many years of service.

Mechanical fasteners, such as screws, bolts, and rivets, are often used to strengthen the joints and seams. Continuous, long runs of soldered seams can cause stress fractures and should therefore be avoided. Common 50-50 tin-lead bar solder is often used for uncoated copper; 60-40 tin-lead solder is used for lead-coated copper. Many lead-free solders are also acceptable.

Adhesives can be used in certain applications. Relatively thin sheet alloys can be bonded to plywood or certain types of foam which act as rigid insulation.

Brazing is the preferred method for joining pipe and tube copper alloys. Copper metal sections are joined with a non-ferrous filler material with a melting point above 800 degrees Fahrenheit but below the melting point of the base metals. Blind or concealed joints are recommended since the color match of silver filler material is fair to poor.

Welding is a process where pieces of copper are effectively melted together, either by flame, electricity, or high pressure. With increasing availability of modern TIG welding equipment, welding of even light-gauge copper decorative elements is gaining acceptance.

Instructional videos are available regarding fluxing and soldering techniques; how to make flat seam solder joints, double-lock standing seams, lap seams, soldering vertical sheet copper lap seams, and stitches (including the butterfly stitch); as well as copper tinning, bending, flaring, and brazing.

== Sealants ==
Sealants are an alternative to solder where additional strength is not required. In most cases, sealants should not be necessary with a properly designed copper installation. They are at best a relatively short-term solution requiring frequent maintenance. Regardless, sealant-filled joints have been used successfully as a secondary waterproofing measure for standing seam and batten seam roofing applications where low-sloped roofs are less than 250 mm/m (3 inches per foot). Sealants can also be used in joints that are primarily designed to accommodate thermal movement of the copper.

The sealants used should be tested by the manufacturer and designated as compatible for use with copper.

In general, butyl, polysulfide, polyurethane, and other inorganic or rubber-based sealants are reasonably compatible with copper. Acrylic, neoprene, and nitrile-based sealants actively corrode copper. Silicone sealants are somewhat successful with copper but their suitability should be verified before application.

== Galvanic corrosion ==
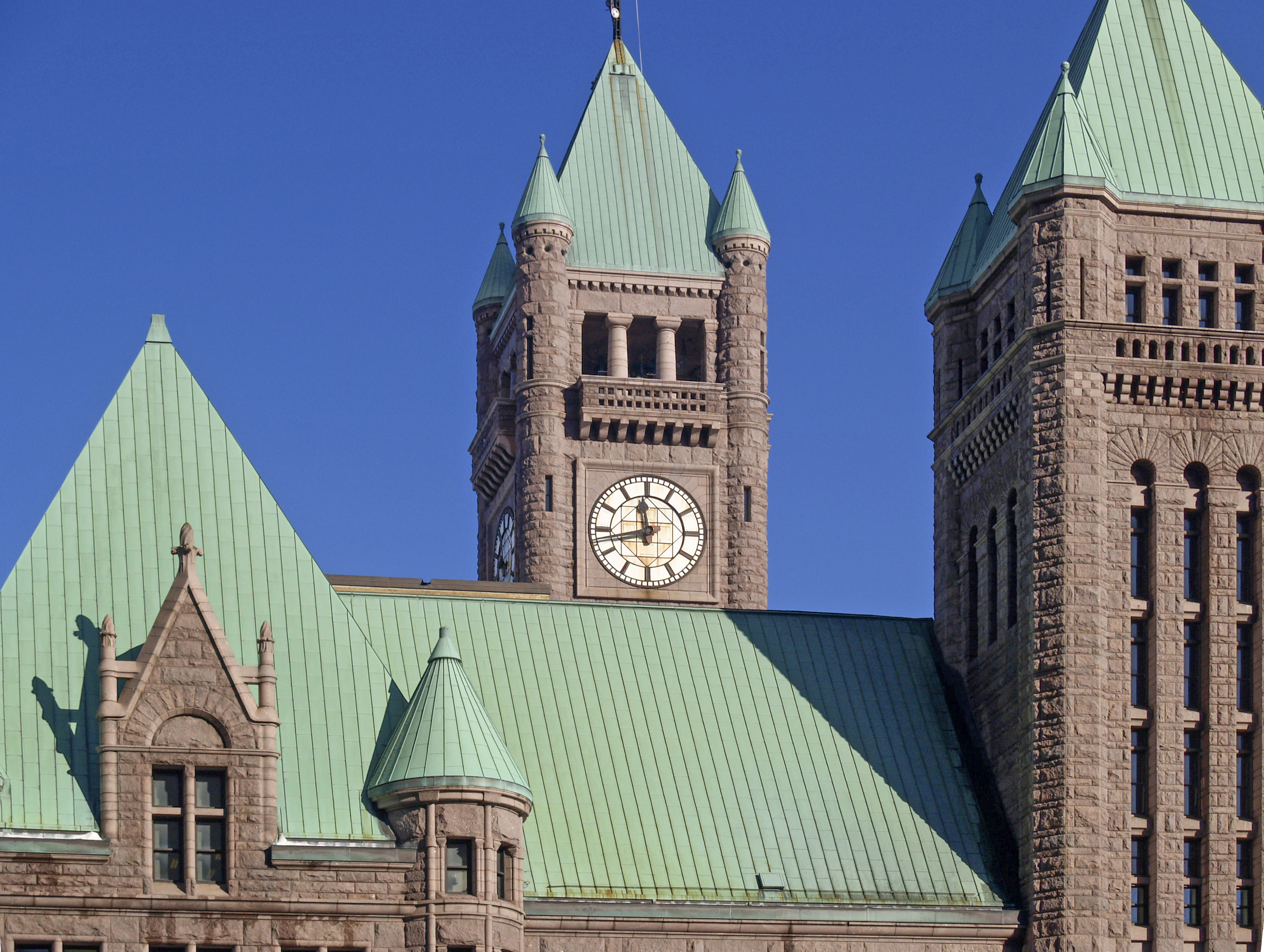
Copper roof at the Minneapolis City Hall.

Galvanic corrosion is an electrochemical process whereby one metal corrodes preferentially to another when both metals are in electrical contact with each other in the presence of an electrolyte, such as moisture and salts. This is because the dissimilar metals have different electrode potentials. The potential difference between the dissimilar metals is the driving force for the accelerated attack on the metal with the lower galvanic number (i.e., the anode). Over time, the anode metal dissolves into the electrolyte.

Metals are ranked according to galvanic numbers as a qualitative measure of their nobility. These numbers qualify the resistance to corrosion of any metal when in contact with other metals. A larger difference in the galvanic number between two metals in contact with each other indicates a greater potential for corrosion. The galvanic numbers of the most common metals used in construction are ranked as follows: 1. aluminium; 2. zinc; 3. steel; 4. iron; 5. stainless steel - active; 6. tin; 7. lead; 8. copper; 9. stainless steel - passive.

Galvanic corrosion is a primary concern with metal roof maintenance. Marine environments present an additional concern due to the higher concentration of salts in the air and water.

Copper is one of the most noble metals. It will not be harmed by contact with other metals but it will cause corrosion to some other metals if contacted directly. The principal metals of concern regarding direct contact with copper are aluminium, light-gauge steel, and zinc. Aluminium and steel flashings and galvanized steel fasteners should not be used with copper. Runoff from a copper roof corrodes aluminium and steel guttering. It is not necessary to isolate copper from lead, tin or many stainless steels under most circumstances.

When it is not possible to avoid contact, an effective method of material separation is required. If paints or coatings are used for isolation, they should be compatible with both metals. Bituminous or zinc chromate primers can be used between copper and aluminium. Bituminous, zinc chromate, or a red lead primer can be effective in separating copper from iron and other ferrous metals. Taping or gasketing with non-absorptive materials or sealants are effective in separating copper from all other metals. In areas with severe exposure, lead or similar gasketing materials should be used, except between copper and aluminium. Water draining from copper surfaces should be prevented from exposure to aluminium and galvanized steel as traces of copper salts may accelerate corrosion. In some cases, anodizing may protect thicker aluminium, such as aluminium window system mullions.

== Natural patinas ==
Copper goes through a natural oxidation process that forms a unique protective patina on the metal. The surface of the metal undergoes a series of color changes: from iridescent/salmon pinks to oranges and reds interspersed with brassy yellows, blues, greens and purples. As the oxide thickens, these colors are replaced by russet and chocolate browns, dull slate grays or blacks, and finally to a light-green or blue-green.

Copper's patination process is complex. It starts immediately on exposure to the environment with the initial formation of copper oxide conversion films that are noticeable within six months. Weathering may be uneven at first but the film becomes even after about nine months. Within the first few years, cuprous and cupric sulfide conversion films darken the surface to browns and then dull slate gray or dull black. Continued weathering transforms the sulfide films to sulfates, which are the notable blue-green or gray-green patinas.

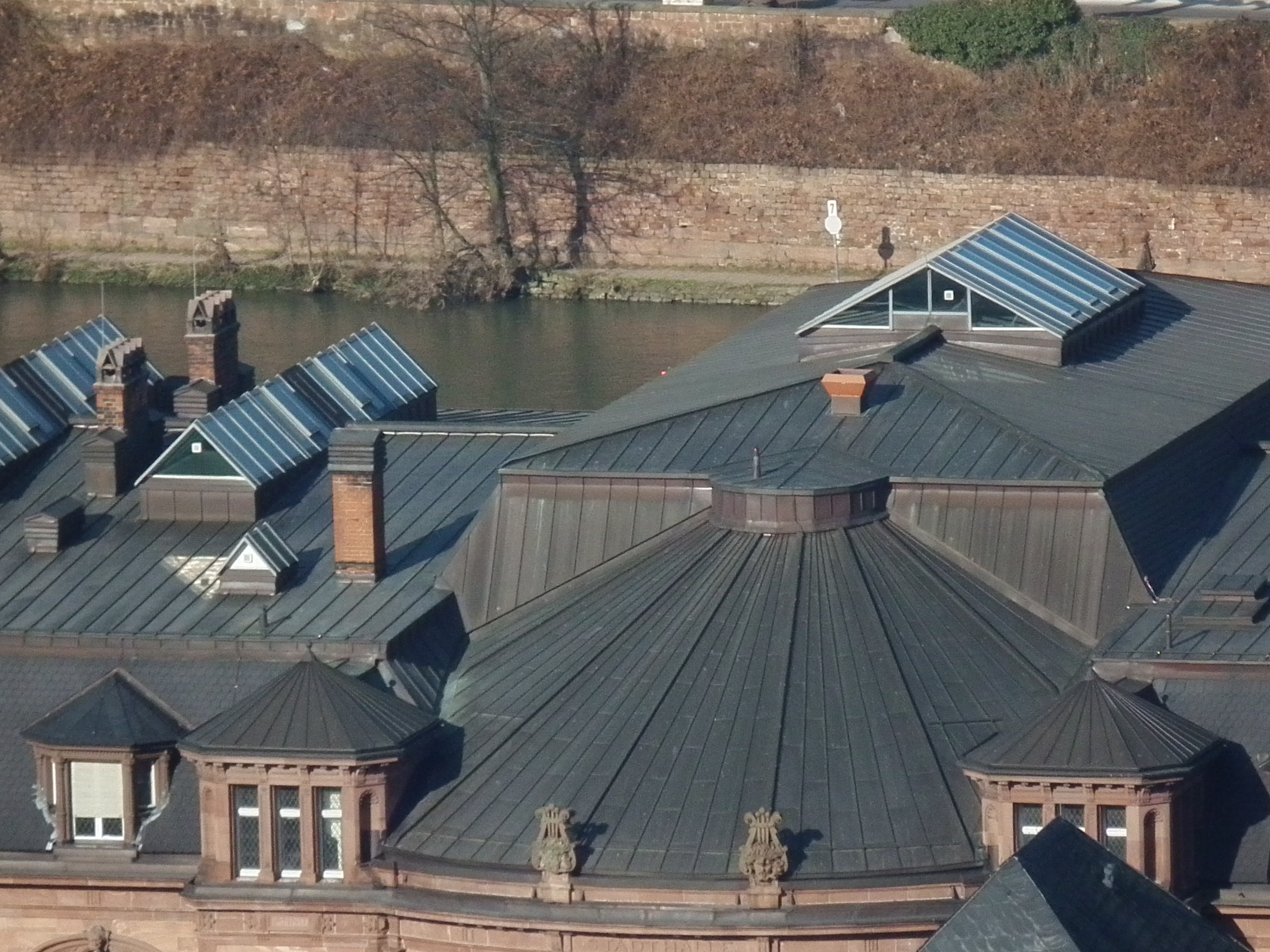
Copper roofs in Heidelberg, Germany.

The rate of patination conversion is dependent upon copper's exposure to moisture, salt, and acidity from acid-forming pollutants. In marine climates, the entire patination process can take seven to nine years. In industrial environments, patina formation reaches its final stage in about fifteen to twenty-five years. In clean rural atmospheres with low concentrations of airborne sulfur dioxide, the final stage may take ten to thirty years to develop. In arid environments, a patina may not form at all if the moisture is insufficient. Where patination does take place in arid environments, it may mature to an ebony or nut brown. In all environments except the coastal areas, patination takes longer for vertical surfaces due to more rapid water runoff.

The copper patinas are very thin: just 0.05080–0.07620 mm (0.002000–0.003000 in) in thickness. Yet, they are highly adherent to the underlying copper metal. The initial and intermediate oxide and sulfide patina films are not particularly corrosion resistant. The final sulfate patina is a particularly durable layer that is highly resistant to all forms of atmospheric corrosion and protects the underlying metal against further weathering. As patination progresses and the durable sulfate layer forms, the rate of corrosion decreases, averaging between 0.0001–0.0003 mm (3.9×10^{−6}–1.18×10^{−5} in) per year. For a 0.6-millimeter-thick (0.024 in) sheet, this equates to less than 5% corrosion over a period of 100 years. Further information is available on copper patination.

== Finishes ==
Copper and its alloys can be 'finished' to achieve a particular look, feel, and/or color. Finishes include mechanical surface treatments, chemical coloring, and coatings. These are described here.

Mechanical surface treatments. Several types of mechanical surface treatments exist. Mill finishes are derived by normal production processes, such as rolling, extrusion, or casting. "Buffeted" finishes impart bright mirror-like appearances after grinding, polishing, and buffing. "Directional textured" finishes provide a smooth, velvety satin sheen in a continuous pattern of fine nearly parallel scratches. "Non-directional textured matte" finishes achieve a rough texture, primarily on castings, as spray sand or metal shot are applied under high pressure. And "patterned" finishes, made by pressing a copper alloy sheet between two rolls, produce a textured and embossed look.

Chemically induced patina. Architects sometimes request a particular patina color at installation. Factory-applied chemically induced pre-patination systems can produce a wide range of colored finishes similar to natural patination. Pre-patinated copper is particularly useful in repairs when there is need to provide close color matches to old copper roofs. Pre-patination is also considered in some modern building materials, such as vertical cladding, soffits, and gutters where patination is desired but would not ordinarily occur.

Chemical coloring of metals is an art involving craftsmanship and experience. Coloring techniques depend upon time, temperature, surface preparation, humidity and other variables. Pre-patinated copper sheets are produced by fabricators under controlled environments using patented chemical processes. Green patina finishes are primarily developed using acid chloride or acid sulfate. Treatments with ammonium chloride (sal ammoniac), cuprous chloride/hydrochloric acid, and ammonium sulfate are somewhat successful. Statuary finishes can be produced in light, medium, and dark brown, depending on the concentration and number of coloring applications. One advantage is that the treatment disguises surface markings on bright mill finish copper and can advance the natural patination process.

Because of the number of variables involved, chemically induced patinas are prone to problems such as a lack of adhesion, excessive staining of adjacent materials, and inability to achieve reasonable color uniformity over large surface areas. Chemical patination applied in the field is not recommended due to variations in temperature, humidity, and chemical requirements. Warranties are prudent when purchasing pre-patinated copper for architectural projects.

Useful techniques and recipes for coloring copper, brass, yellow-brass, bronze, cast bronze, gilding metal, along with various physical and chemical textural finishes are available.

Coatings. Clear coatings preserve the natural color, warmth and metallic tone of copper alloys. However, particularly on exterior applications, they introduce maintenance into what is naturally a maintenance-free material. They are organic chemicals that are dry at ambient temperatures or require heat for curing or solvent evaporation. Examples of clear organic coatings include alkyd, acrylic, cellulose acetate butyrate, epoxy, nitrocellulose, silicone, and urethane. Further details are available.

Oils and waxes exclude moisture from copper surfaces and simultaneously enhance their appearance by bringing out a rich luster and depth of color. Oiling is typically used to prolong the time exposed copper remains in a brown to black tone. It will not keep copper shiny on an exterior installation. Oils and waxes offer short-term protection for exterior applications and longer-term protection for interior applications.

Oiling predominates for roofing and flashing work. The most popular oils are Lemon Oil, U.S.P., Lemon Grass Oil, Native E.I., paraffin oils, linseed oil, and castor oil. On copper roofing or flashing, reapplication as infrequently as once every three years can effectively retard patina formation. In arid climates, the maximum span between oilings may be extended to from three to five years.

Waxing is generally reserved for architectural components subject to close inspection and/or traffic. Mixes considered satisfactory include Carnauba wax and wood turpentine, or beeswax and wood turpentine, or paste waxes.

Opaque paint coatings are used primarily for work applied over copper when substrate integrity and longevity are desired but a specific color other than the naturally occurring copper hues is required.

Zinc-tin coatings are an alternative to lead coatings since they have approximately the same appearance and workability.

Vitreous enamel coatings are used primarily for art work over copper.

More details on copper finishes are available.

== Applications ==
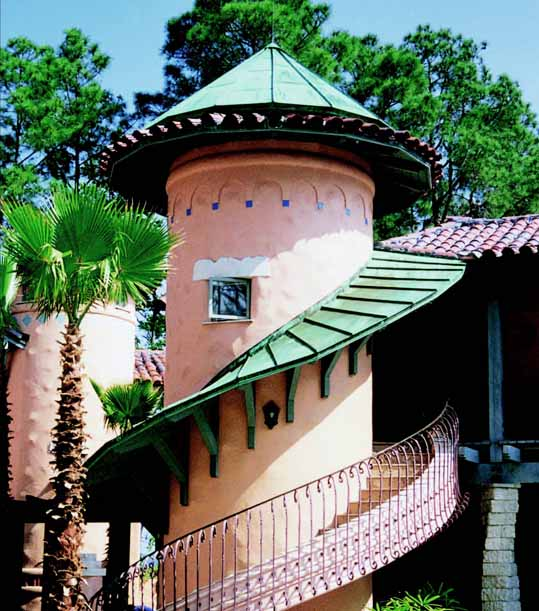
Example of architectural copper work, showing copper dome with copper finial, winding spiral copper roof awning, and a copper railing.

Craftsmen and designers utilize copper's inherent benefits to build aesthetically pleasing and long-lasting building systems. From cathedrals to castles and from homes to offices, copper is used in many products: low-sloped and pitched roofs, soffits, fascias, flashings, gutters, downspouts, building expansion joints, domes, spires, and vaults. Copper is also used to clad walls and other surfaces in the exterior and interior environment.

=== Roofing ===
Copper offers a unique character and durability as a roofing material. Its appearance can complement any style of building, from traditional to modern. Its warmth and beauty make it a desirable material for many architects. Copper also satisfies demands of architects and building owners regarding lifetime cost, ease of fabrication, low maintenance, and environmental friendliness.

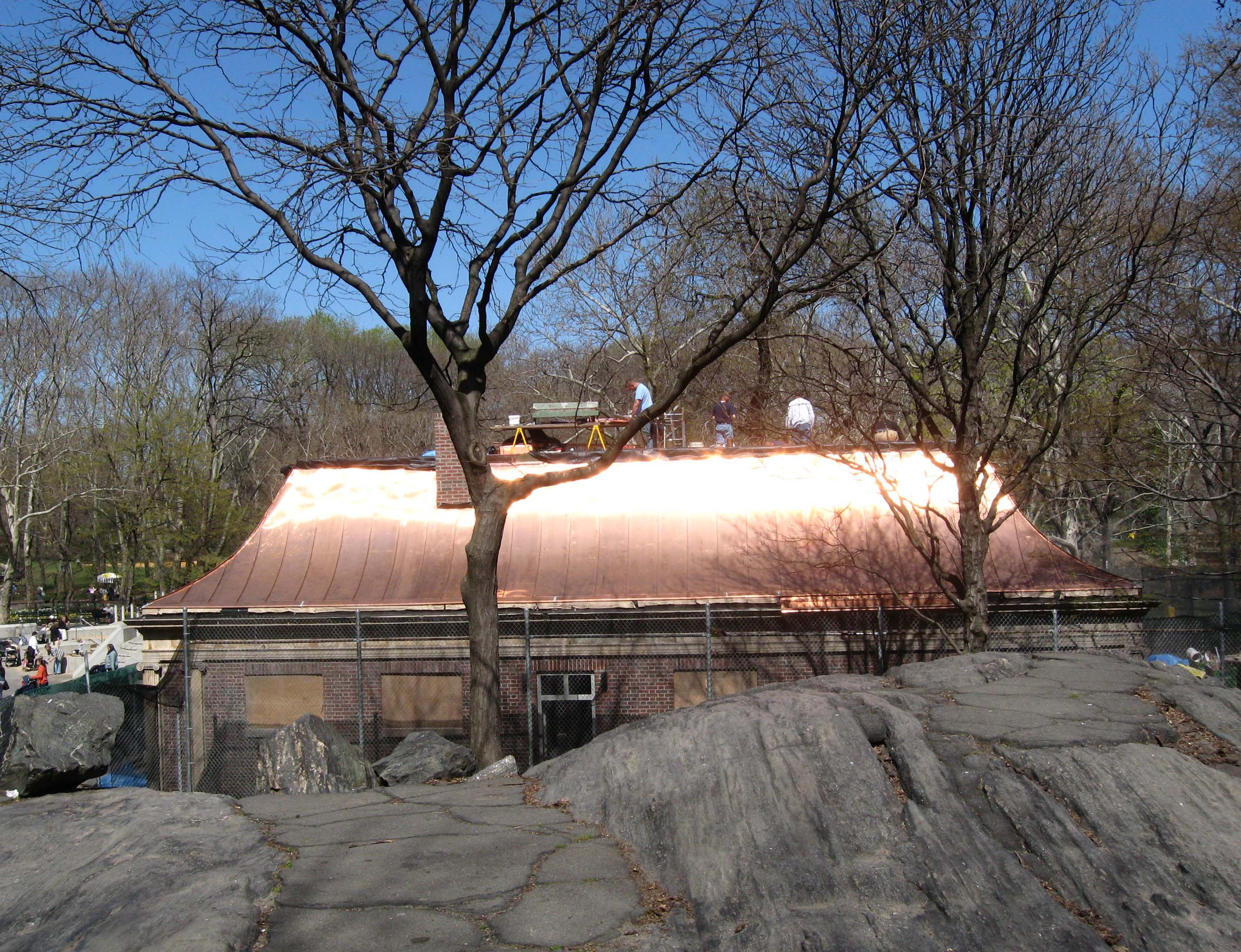
New copper roof installation.

The installation of copper roofing is a craft requiring experienced installers. Its ductility and malleability make it a compatible material to form over irregular roof structures. It is easy to hammer or work into watertight designs without caulk or gaskets. Domes and other curved roof shapes are readily handled with copper.

When properly designed and installed, a copper roof provides an economical, long-term roofing solution. Tests on European copper roofs from the 18th century showed that, in theory, copper roofs can last one thousand years.

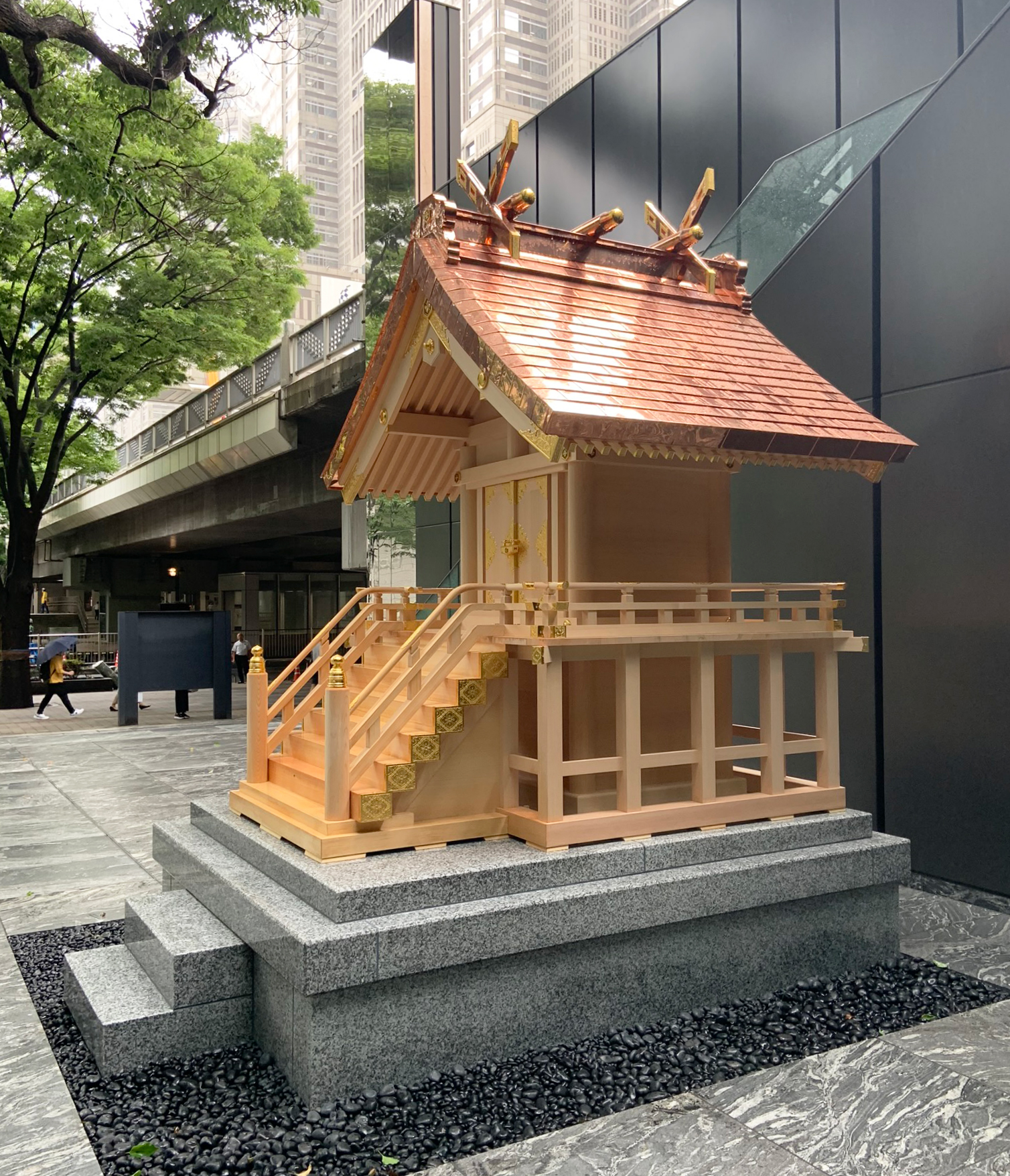
New copper roof of Shinto outdoor altar.

Another advantage of copper roofing systems is that they are relatively easy to repair. For small pits or cracks, affected areas can be cleaned and filled with solder. For larger areas, patches can be cut and soldered into place. For major areas, the affected copper can be cut out and replaced using a flat locked soldered seam.

Copper roofs can be designed to meet or surpass other materials in terms of energy savings. A vented copper roof assembly at Oak Ridge National Laboratories (U.S.) substantially reduced heat gain versus stone-coated steel shingle (SR246E90) or asphalt shingle (SR093E89), resulting in lower energy costs.

Types of copper roofs include:

Standing seam roofing is composed of preformed or field-formed pans. The pans run parallel to the slope of the roof and are joined to adjacent pans with double-locked standing seams. Copper cleats locked into these seams secure the roofing to the deck.

Batten seam roofing consists of copper pans running parallel to the roof slope, separated by wood battens. Battens are covered with copper caps that are loose-locked into adjacent pans to help to secure the roofing. Cleats attached to the battens secure the roofing pans. Transverse seams are required to join ends of preformed pans.

Horizontal seam roofs, also called the Bermuda style, consist of copper pans where the long dimension runs horizontally across a roof, attached to horizontal wood nailers. A step is used at each nailer to allow adjacent pans to lock effectively. The height and spacing of the steps enable different appearances.

A common design for a chevron roof is based on a batten seam construction to which auxiliary battens are attached. With proper design, decorative battens can have almost any shape or size and run in any direction.

Flat locked and soldered seam roofing systems are typically used on flat or low-pitched roofs. They are also used on curved surfaces such as domes and barrel vaults.

Flat seam unsoldered copper roofing is a shingle-like option for high slope applications.

Mansard roofs are used on vertical or nearly vertical surfaces. For the most part, these roofs are based on standing seam or batten seam construction.

Long-pan systems (pans and seam lengths greater than 3 m or 10 feet) accommodate the cumulative expansion stress over long spans of copper sheets. These installations can be complicated due to the length of roof pan versus seam length, cleat design and spacing, and the physical expansion characteristics of copper sheets. This expansion must be accommodated by fixing the pan at one end (which accumulates the expansion at the loose end) or by fixing the center of the pan (which accumulates half of the expansion at both free ends). In addition to panels, copper roof tiles can add uniqueness to a roofing system. They can be used on any roof shape and in all types of climates.

=== Flashing ===
While most modern construction materials are fairly resistant to moisture penetration, many joints between masonry units, panels, and architectural features are not. The effects of natural movement due to settlement, expansion, and contraction may eventually lead to leaks.

Copper is an excellent material for flashing because of its malleability, strength, solderability, workability, high resistance to the caustic effects of mortars and hostile environments, and long service life. This enables a roof to be built without weak points. Since flashing is expensive to replace if it fails, copper's long life is a major cost advantage.

Cold rolled 1/8-inch (3.2 mm) hard temper copper is recommended for most flashing applications. This material offers more resistance than soft copper to the stresses of expansion and contraction. Soft copper can be specified where extreme forming is required, such as in complicated roof shapes. Thermal movement in flashings is prevented or is permitted only at predetermined locations.

Flashing installed incorrectly can promote line corrosion and shorten the life of valley flashing, especially in acidic environments. The risk is most prevalent at the leading edge of shingles where the shingle edges rest on the copper flashing.

Through-wall flashing diverts moisture that has entered the wall before it can cause damage. Counterflashing diverts water to the base flashing, which, in turn, diverts it to other materials.

Various types of copper flashings and copings exist. Diagramatic explanations are available.

=== Gutters and downspouts ===
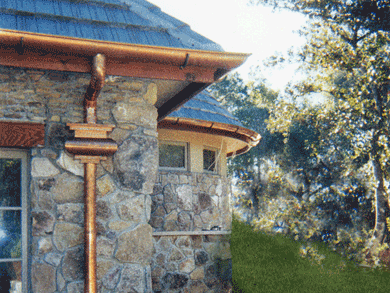
Copper gutter system showing half round copper gutters, radius copper guttering, copper leader head, round copper downspout pipe, decorative copper gutter hangers.

Leaking gutters and downspouts can cause serious damage to a building's interior and exterior. Copper is a good choice for gutters and downspouts because it makes strong leak-proof joints. Gutters and downspouts made with copper are expected to outlast other metal materials and plastics. Even in corrosion-prone seacoast environments or in areas with acid rain or smog, copper gutters and downspouts can provide 50 years or more of service.

Downspouts can be plain or corrugated, round or rectangular. sixteen-or-twenty-ounce (450 or 570 g) cold rolled copper is typically used. Decorative designs are also available.

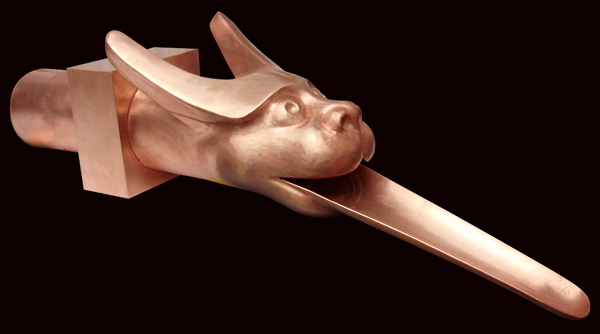
Gargoyle rain spout roof scupper combination fashioned from pure copper.

Hung copper gutters are supported by brass- or copper brackets or hangers, or by brass straps. Copper gutter linings are often built into wood framed supporting structures. Scuppers are used to provide an outlet through parapet walls or gravel stops on flat and built-up roofs to allow drainage of excess water. They can be used in conjunction with gutters and downspouts to divert water flow to the desired location. Copper roof sumps are generally used for draining small roof areas such as canopies. Roof sump drains are not recommended for general roof drainage systems.

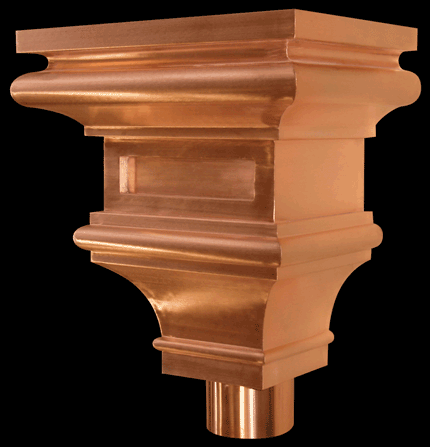
Custom-made copper leader head.

One of the disadvantages of copper is its propensity to stain light-colored building materials, such as marble or limestone. Green staining is particularly visible on light-colored surfaces. Lead-coated copper can result in a black or gray stain that may blend well with lighter building materials. Staining can be reduced by collecting runoff in gutters and directing it away from the building via downspouts or by designing drip edges to help reduce the amount of copper laden moisture that comes into contact with material below. Coating the adjacent surface of the porous material with a clear silicone sealant also reduces staining. Staining may not develop in areas of rapid run-off due to the short dwell time of water on the copper.

=== Domes, spires and vaults ===
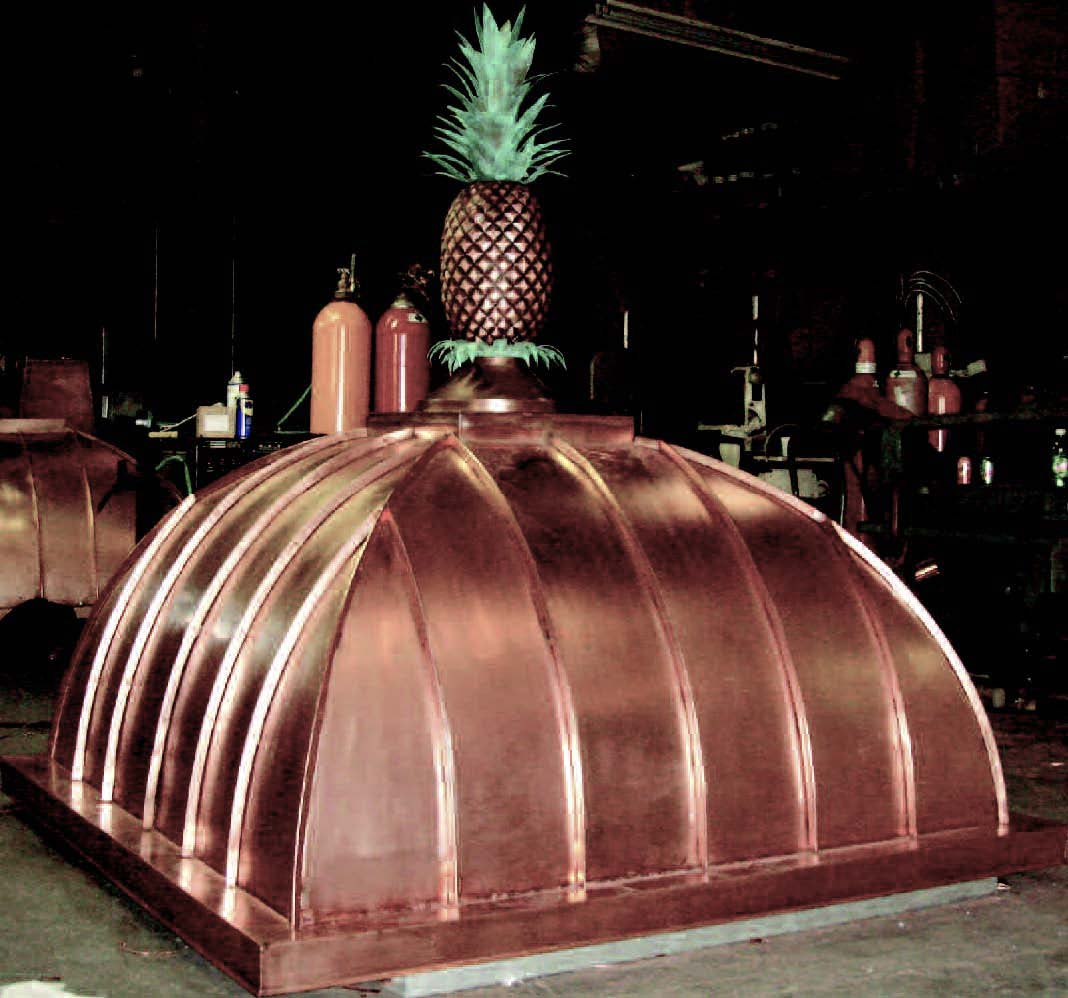
Copper dome made with standing seam copper panels and with a copper finial pineapple mounted on top. The copper finial is handmade from uncoated copper and the pineapple leaves are patinated copper.

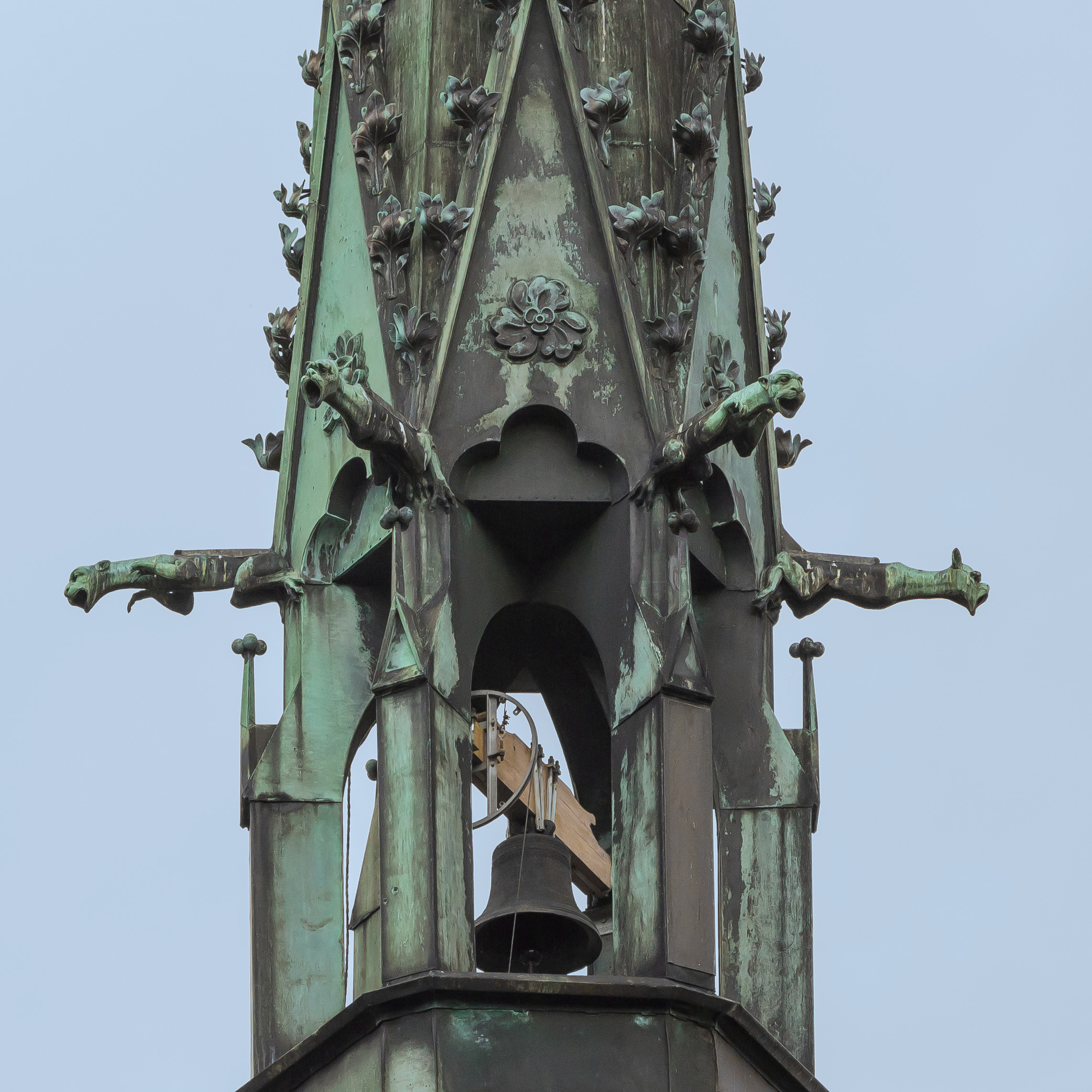
Copper belfry of St. Laurentius church, Bad Neuenahr-Ahrweiler

There are many types of copper domes, spires, and vaults, both with simple geometries or complex curved surfaces and multi-faceted designs. Examples include circular domes with diagonal flat seam systems, circular domes with standing seam systems, circular domes with flat seam systems, conical spires, flat seam roofing on octagonal spires, standing seam barrel vaults, and flat seam barrel vaults. Information about steps for dome panel layouts and specifications for copper constructions is available.

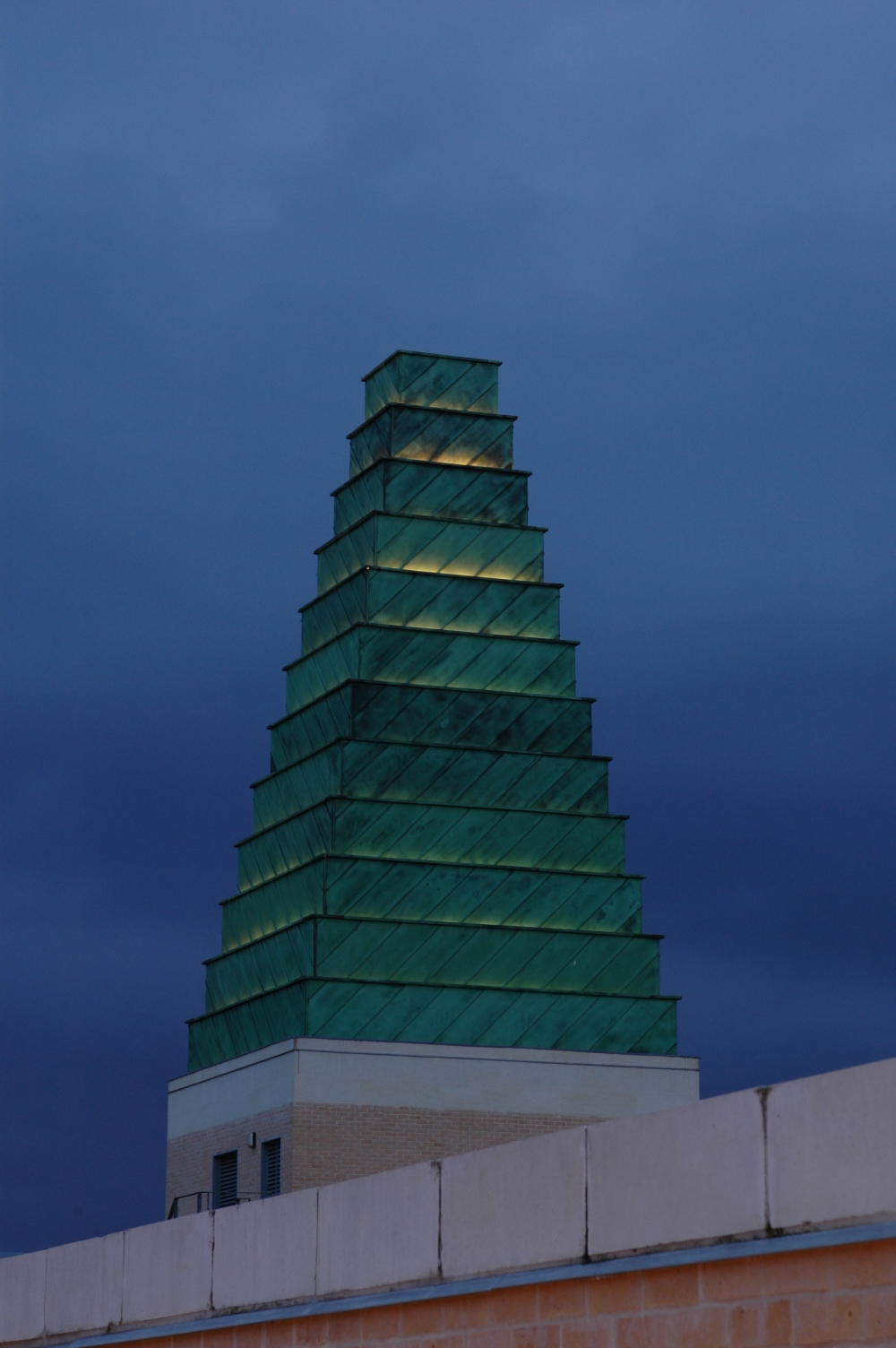
Copper-clad spire at the Saïd Business School, Oxford, U.K., is a modern interpretation of "Dreaming Spires."

=== Wall cladding ===
Copper cladding has become popular in modern architecture. The technology enables architects to incorporate visually desirable features into their designs, such as embossed or shaped-metal cladding.

Cladding enables structures to be made with much less weight than solid copper. Four-millimeter-thick (5/32 in) composites weigh 10 kgf/m^{2} (2.08 pounds per square foot), only 35% as much as solid copper of the same thickness.

Copper cladding is used in building exteriors and indoor environments. On building exteriors, copper cladding sheets, shingles, and pre-fabricated panels shield buildings from the elements, acting as first line of defenses against wind, dust, and water. The cladding is lightweight, durable, and corrosion resistant, which is particularly important for large buildings. Common interior applications include lobby walls, soffits, column facings, and interior walls of elevator cabs.

Copper cladding can be cut, routed, sawed, filed, drilled, screwed, welded, and curved to form complex shapes. A variety of finishes and colors are available.

Flat, circular, and unusually shaped walls can be covered with copper cladding. Most are field-formed from sheet material. They can also be pre-manufactured. In addition, engineered systems such as insulated panels, non-insulated honeycomb panels, copper screen panels, and structural wall claddings are available. Horizontal copper siding provides a relatively flat appearance with fine horizontal lines. Beveled copper panels have depth for heavy-shadowed effects. Flat siding has minimal shadows. Structural panels are designed to be attached directly to a wall structure without the use of a continuous substrate. Diagonal flat lock panels are used on curved surfaces, such as domes, spires and vaults. Horizontal flat lock panels are basically identical to flat seam roofing applied on a vertical surface. Copper screen panels are a lightweight finish screen that can be perforated or have shaped openings to function as sun or decorative screens. A copper alloy curtain wall is a non-structural outer building covering that keeps out weather. Composite copper cladding is made by attaching copper sheeting to both sides of rigid thermoplastic sheet.

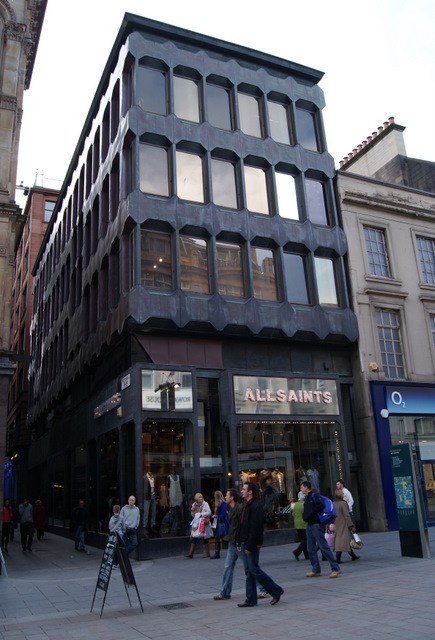
The former British Overseas Aircraft Corporation headquarters building in Glasgow is clad with copper.

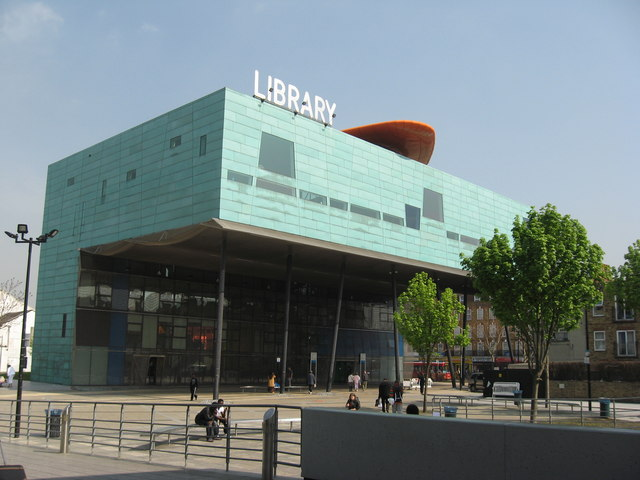
Peckham Library, in London, won the 2000 Stirling Award for Architectural Innovation, the 2001 Copper Cladding Award, and the 2002 Civic Trust Award for excellence in public architecture.

Several different copper facade cladding systems are available:

Seaming technique. This is a vertical or horizontal classical cladding construction used in copper roof and façade designs. Available in sheets and strips, the cladding is fixed with clips. Since water tightness may not be a concern on vertical surfaces, angle standing seams are often sufficient. Double lock standing seams are often not necessary. Links to photographs of horizontal and vertical standing and flat lock seams at the University of Debrecen's Copper Gateway in Hungary and of pre-oxidized copper clad seamed facades at the Hotel Crowne Plaza Milano, in Milan, Italy, are available.

System shingles. Shingles are pre-manufactured rectangular or square flat tiles for roofs, walls, and individual building components. They have 180^{0} folds along all four borders – two folds towards the external side and two towards the internal side. The shingles are interlocked during installation. The fastening is hidden with stainless steel or copper clips on wood sheeting or trapezoidal panels. Machine notching and folding ensures that the shingles have uniform dimensions. Links to pictorial examples of copper shingles in an exterior and interior environment are available.

Panels. Panels are sheets of pre-profiled copper with lengths up to 4–5 m (13–16 ft) and standard widths up to 500 mm (20 in). They are two-sided cladding elements that can be with or without an end base. Assembly is performed using the tongue and groove principle or by overlapping. Panels can be assembled vertically, horizontally, or diagonally. There are three basic forms: tongue and groove panels laid vertically as level surface facade cladding; tongue and groove panels laid horizontally as level surface facade cladding; and custom panels laid in different directions with visible or masked fastening, flush against the surface or overlapping. Links to representative photographs of golden-colored and patinated-green panels are available.

System cassettes. This is a rigid rectangular ventilated wall system consisting of curved or flat metal panels mounted and secured to a supporting structure. All four borders are pre-folded at the factory. Folded edges on every side allow large sheet metal parts to lie even with the cladding surface. Fixing is usually by riveting, screwing, or by using angle brackets or bolt hooks to fix the cassettes directly to the substrate. System cassettes are pre-profiled to meet specific architectural requirements. Links to representative photographs of cassette cladding are available.

Graphic Concrete. Graphic concrete is a method for creating permanent patterns, images, or text on concrete surfaces, developed by Finnish interior architect Samuli Naamanka in 1997. It has been featured in several award-winning architectural projects, including: Hämeenlinna Provincial Archive, winner of the "Concrete Structure of the Year 2009" award. Asunto Oy Helsingin Viuhka, winner of the "Concrete Structure of the Year 2016" award. The method highlights the versatility of concrete in architecture, providing unique aesthetics to façades.

Profiled sheets. Profiled sheets are well suited for covering large cladding surfaces without joints because of their regular, unimposing profiles. Available in a wide variety of shapes, they are well-suited for new flat roofs, façade and pitched roofs, and renovation work. Profiles available include: sinusoidal wave corrugated profiles; trapezoidal profiles with various geometries; and custom profiles with special geometry and edges. They can be pre-manufactured and specified with embossed patterns or other designs.

Special shapes. Special shaped façades are available to impart desired visual effects. Perforated metal sheets are available with a variety of shapes (round, square, oblong, etc.) and arrangements (rectangular, diagonal, parallel width, staggered, etc.). They can be designed to create subtle patterns, 'super graphics,' and text. Mesh and textile structures are also available. Links to photographs of special-shaped cladded buildings are available.

=== Building expansion joints ===
Designing for the movement of building components due to temperature, loads, and settlement is an important part of architectural detailing. Building expansion joints provide barriers to the exterior and cover spaces between components. Copper is an excellent material for expansion joints because it is easy to form and lasts a long time. Details regarding roof conditions, roof edges, floors, are available.

=== Indoor design ===
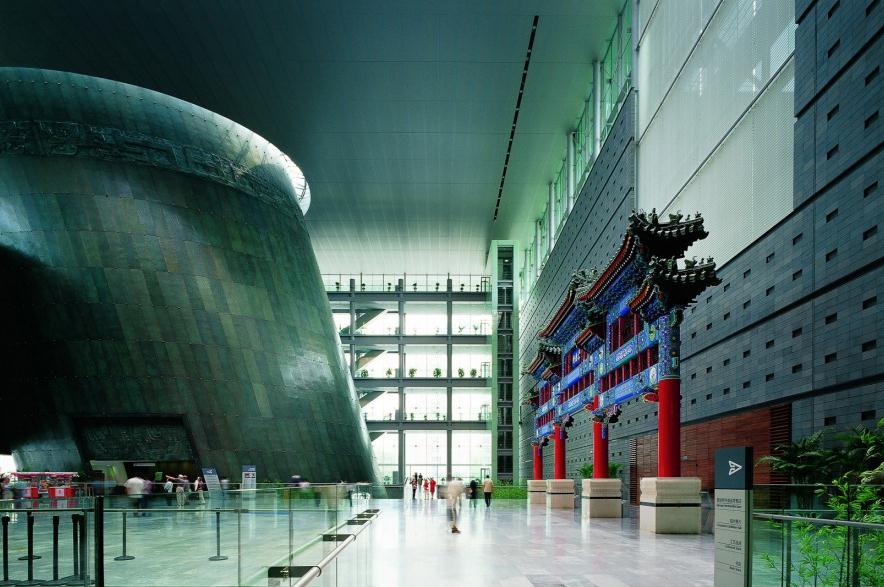
Architectural copper cladding in the interior of the Capital Museum, Beijing, People's Republic of China.

Copper aesthetically enhances interior wall systems, ceilings, fixtures, furniture, and hardware by evoking an atmosphere of warmth, tranquility, and calm. Regarding performance advantages, it is lightweight, fire resistant, durable, workable, and non-organic (it does not off-gas). Typical copper-based interiors include panels, shingles, screens, ornaments, fixtures, and other decorative enhancements.

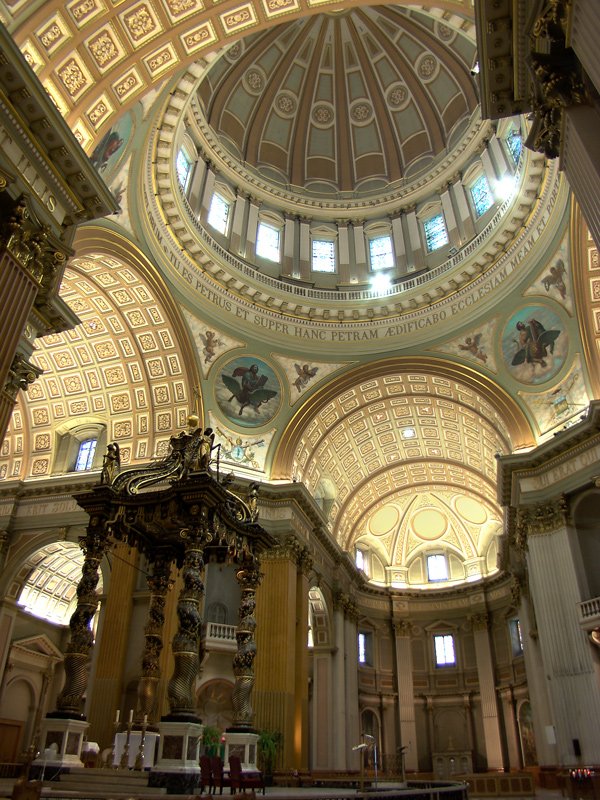
Cathedral-Basilica Mary Queen of the World, in Montreal. At the transept crossing in front of the main altar stands the Baldacchino with red copper, made in Rome in 1900.

Since copper surfaces kill pathogenic microbes, architects who design public facilities, such as hospitals and mass transit facilities, look to copper products as a public health benefit. In recent years, copper countertops, range hoods, sinks, handles, doorknobs, faucets, and furniture embellishments have become trendy – both for their appearance as well as for their antimicrobial properties. (See main article: Antimicrobial copper-alloy touch surfaces).

Copper is joined in indoor environments by butt welding, soldering, rivets, nails, screws, bolting, standing seams, lap seams (with and without fasteners), flat seams, bolted flanges, splines, flush laps, and batten seams.

=== Green buildings ===
Sustainable materials are key elements of green buildings. Some benefits of sustainable materials include durability, long life, recyclability, and energy and thermal efficiency. Copper ranks highly in all of these categories.

Copper is one of nature's most efficient thermal and electrical conductors, which helps to conserve energy. Because of its high thermal conductivity, it is used extensively in building heating systems, direct exchange heat pumps, and solar power and hot water equipment. Its high electrical conductivity increases the efficiency of lighting, electrical motors, fans, and appliances, making a building's operation more cost effective with less energy and environmental impact.

Because copper has a better thermal conductivity rating than usual façade and roofing materials, it is well-suited to solar thermal façade systems. The first commercial application of a fully integrated solar thermal copper façade system was installed at the Pori Public Swimming Complex in Finland. The installation is an urban example of sustainability and carbon emissions reduction. The solar façade works in conjunction with roof collectors and is supplemented by roof-mounted photovoltaics that provide 120,000 kWh of heat, an amount of energy equivalent to that used annually by six average family houses in cold-climate Finland.

One standard in the United States Green Building Council (USGBC)'s Leadership in Energy and Environmental Design rating system (LEED) requires that newly constructed buildings include materials containing pre- and post-consumer recycled content. Most copper products used in construction (except electrical materials that require highly refined virgin copper) contain a large percentage of recycled content. See: Copper in architecture#Recycling.

== Awards ==
Award programs highlight copper architecture installations in Canada and the U.S. and in Europe. An International Copper and the Home Competition also exists. Judged by architecture and copper industry experts, criteria for the awards programs include copper in building design, craft of copper installation, excellence in innovation, and historic renovation.

== See also ==
- Building materials
- Sustainable architecture
- Green buildings
