= Copper cladding =

Application of copper to the exterior of buildings

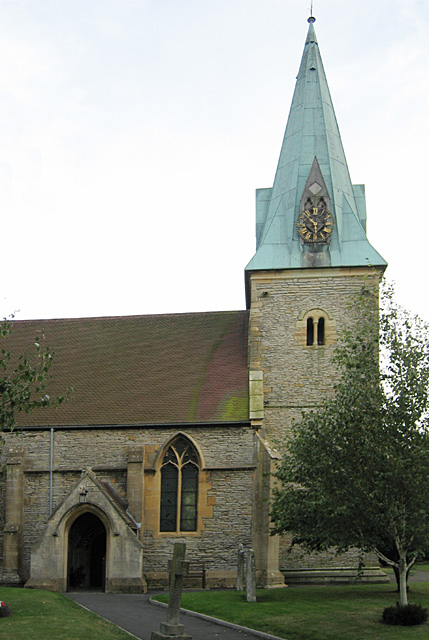
Harvington Parish Church, with its copper-clad spire

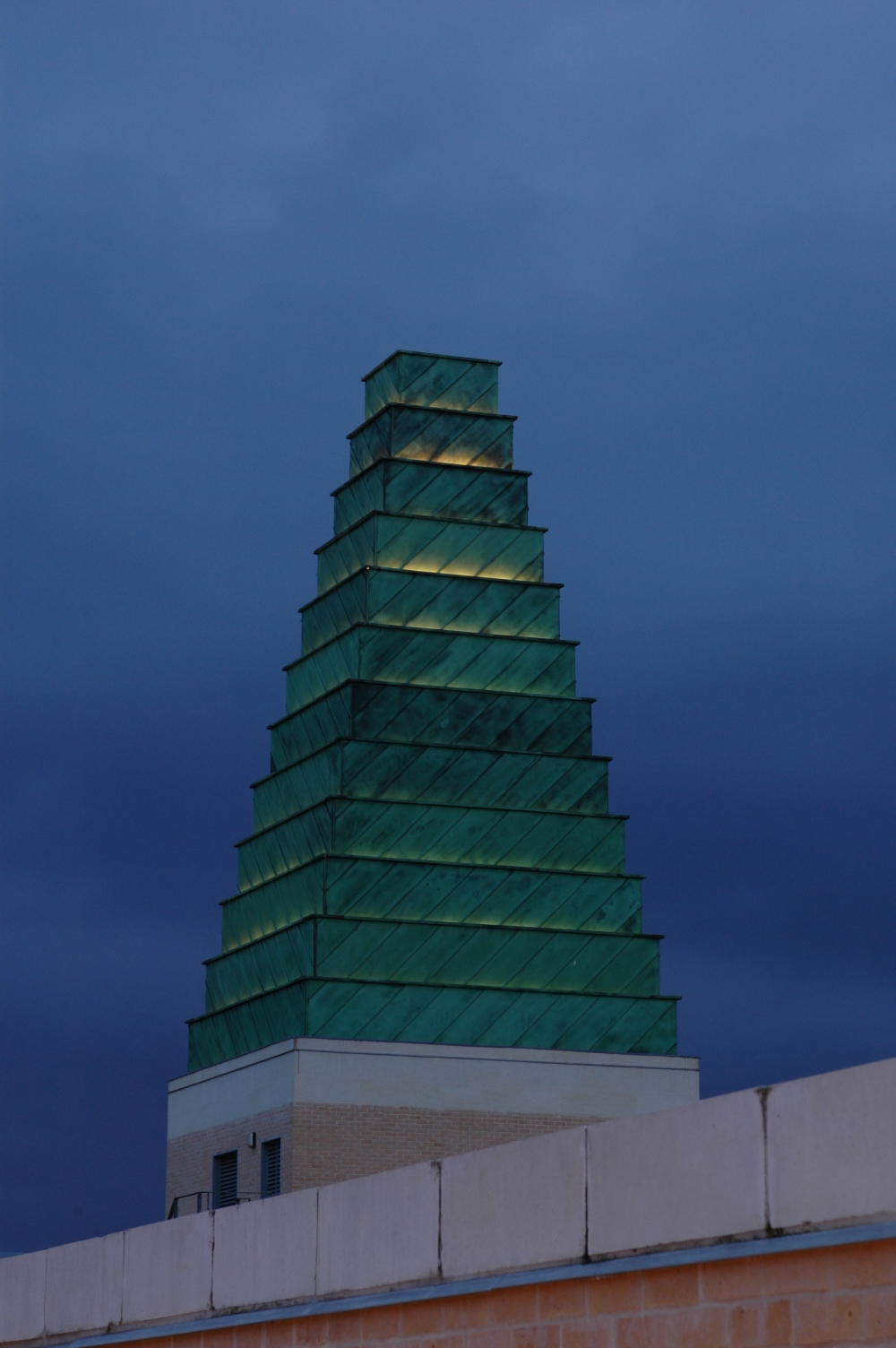
Copper-clad spire at the Saïd Business School Oxford

There are four main techniques used today in the UK and mainland Europe for copper cladding a building:

- seamed-cladding (typically 0.7 mm thick copper sheet on the facade): max 600 mm by 4000 mm 'seam centres'.
- shingle-cladding (typically made from 0.7 mm thick copper sheet): max 600 mm by 4000 mm 'seam centres'.
- slot-in panels (typically made from 1.0 mm thick copper sheet): max 350 mm wide for 1.0 mm, by nominal 4 m length.
- cassettes (typically made from 1.0 mm up to 1.5 mm thick copper sheet): largest-format cladding elements, more subframing is needed: can be 900 mm x nominal 4000 mm length.

When selecting size of a cladding element, take wind-loadings into account, and also consider the standard sizes available of the sheet (or coil) pre-material, to minimise material wastage through off-cuts. This helps to reduce costs.

The choice of which system to use depends on the aesthetic effect required, and building geometry can also have an influence on the choice.

Copper cladding is very durable, lightweight compared to other materials and techniques, and at the end of the building life is also 100% recyclable.

Depending on metal prices, copper may be a very cost-effective cladding and roofing material. With good building design, materials choice and craftsmanship, copper roofing or facade cladding may be cheaper than slates or concrete tiles, especially when one takes into account the lasting colour, durability, maintenance-free and lightweight nature of the cladding.

Because the UK code of practice for "hard metal" cladding (as opposed to lead cladding) is quite old – CP143: part 12 (1970) – the major manufacturers have to provide detailed technical advice and information for architects, designers and builders, and cultivate skilled installers with years of experience to draw on.

Typically, an installer of hard metal roofing and cladding must put in around 8–10 years on-the-job in order to achieve a respectable experience on a work site.

== See also ==
- Copper in architecture: Wall cladding
