= MRI RF shielding =

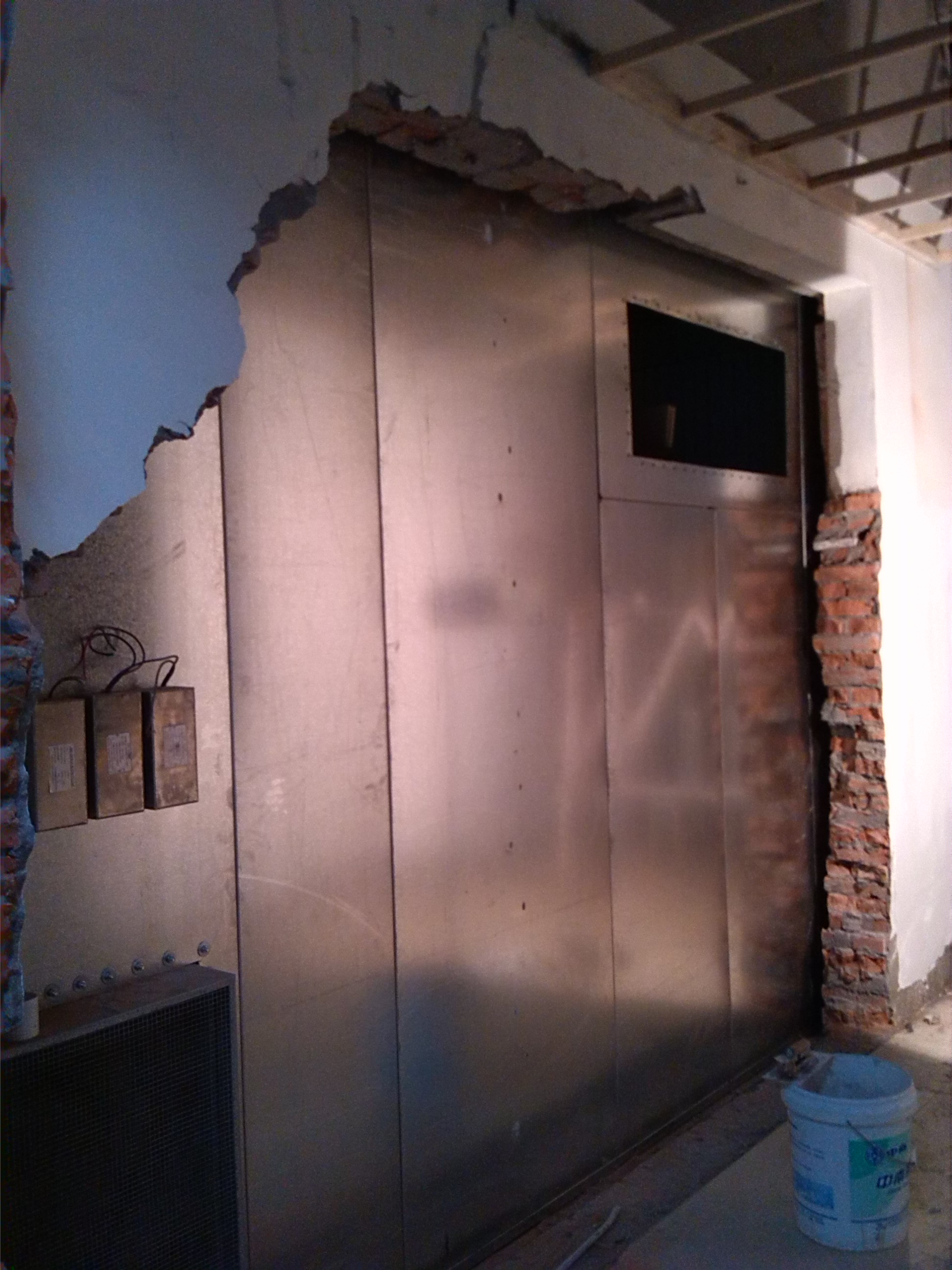
MRI RF shielding

RF shielding for MRI rooms is necessary to prevent noise of radio frequency from entering into the MRI scanner and distorting the image. The three main types of shielding used for MRIs are copper, steel, and aluminum. Copper is generally considered the best shielding for MRI rooms.

RF shielding should not be confused with magnetic shielding, which is used to prevent the magnetic field of the MRI magnet from interfering with pacemakers and other equipment outside of the MRI room.

After the MRI room has been completely shielded, all utility services such as electrical for lights, air conditioning, fire sprinklers and other penetrations into the room must be routed through specialized filters provided by the RF shielding vendor.
