= Copper alloys in aquaculture =

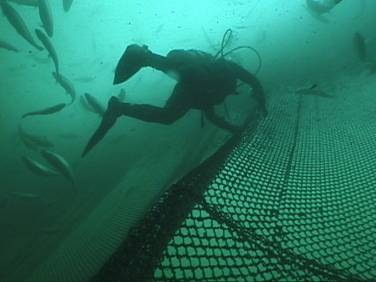
A copper alloy pen that has been deployed on a fish farm at depth of 14 feet for one year shows no signs of biofouling.

Copper alloys are important netting materials in aquaculture (the farming of aquatic organisms including fish farming). Various other materials including nylon, polyester, polypropylene, polyethylene, plastic-coated welded wire, rubber, patented twine products (Spectra, Dyneema), and galvanized steel are also used for netting in aquaculture fish enclosures around the world. All of these materials are selected for a variety of reasons, including design feasibility, material strength, cost, and corrosion resistance.

What sets copper alloys apart from the other materials used in fish farming is that copper alloys are antimicrobial, that is, they destroy bacteria, viruses, fungi, algae, and other microbes. (For information about the antimicrobial properties of copper and its alloys, see Antimicrobial properties of copper and Antimicrobial copper alloy touch surfaces).

In the marine environment, the antimicrobial/algaecidal properties of copper alloys prevent biofouling, which can briefly be described as the undesirable accumulation, adhesion, and growth of microorganisms, plants, algae, tube worms, barnacles, mollusks, and other organisms on man-made marine structures. By inhibiting microbial growth, copper alloy aquaculture pens avoid the need for costly net changes that are necessary with other materials. The resistance of organism growth on copper alloy nets also provides a cleaner and healthier environment for farmed fish to grow and thrive.

In addition to their antifouling benefits, copper alloys have strong structural and corrosion-resistant properties in marine environments.

Due to these properties – antifouling, high strength, and corrosion resistance – copper alloys are considered a desirable material for marine applications such as condenser tubing, water intake screens, ship hulls, offshore structure, and sheathing. In the past 25 years or so, the copper alloys have become widely used in the marine aquaculture industry. The industry is now actively deploying copper alloy netting and structural materials in commercial large-scale fish farming operations around the world.

== Growth of aquaculture ==
Aquaculture, an industry that has emerged only in recent decades, has become one of the fastest growing sectors of the world food economy. Aquaculture already supplies more than half of the world's demand for fish. This percentage is predicted to increase dramatically over the next few decades.

== Biofouling ==
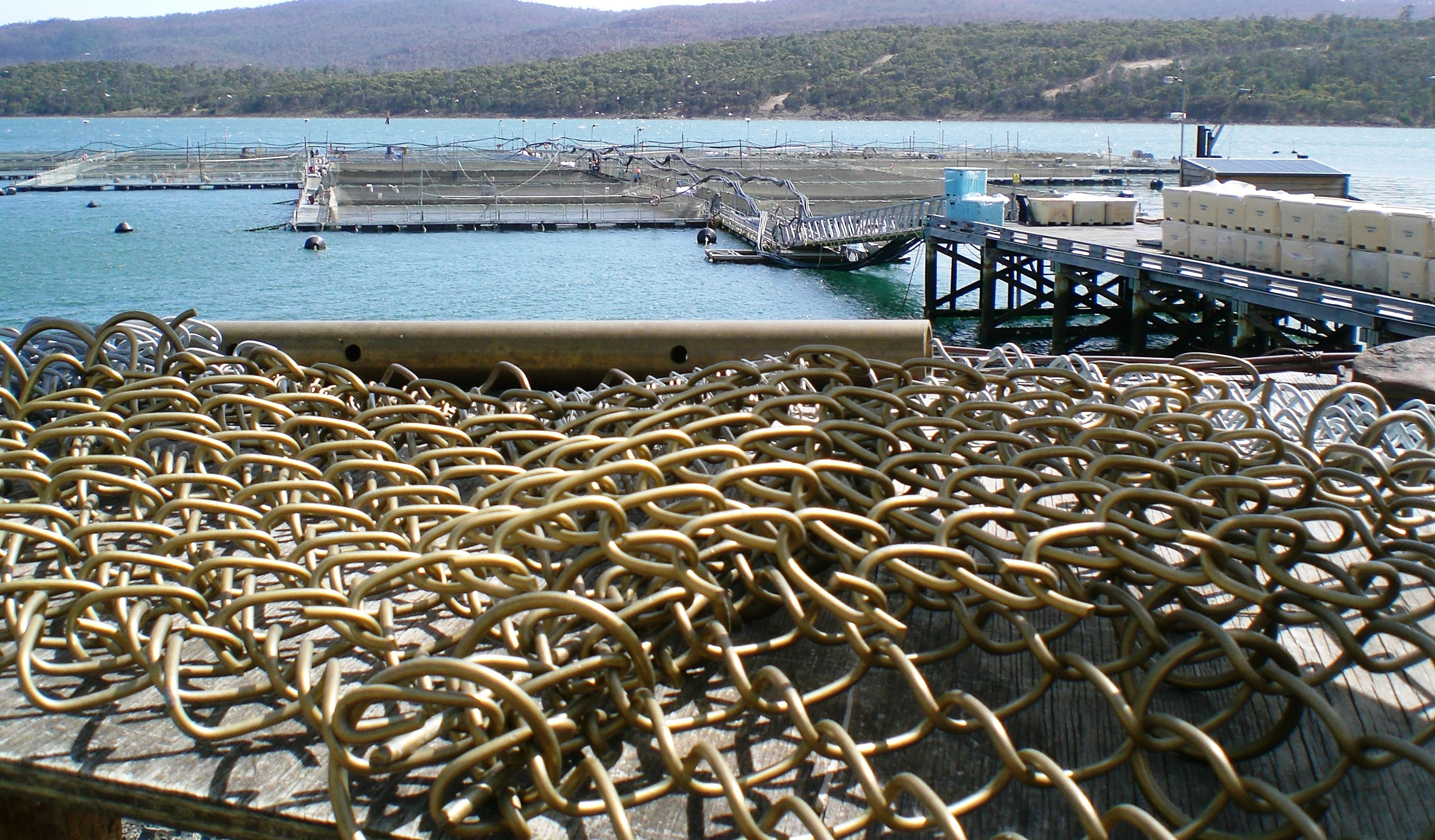
Copper alloy mesh installed at an Atlantic salmon fish farm in Tasmania. Foreground: the chain link copper alloy mesh resting on a dock. Distant background: copper alloy mesh pens are installed on the fish farm.

Biofouling is one of the biggest problems in aquaculture. Biofouling occurs on non-copper materials in the marine environment, including fish pen surfaces and nettings. For example, it was noted that the open area of a mesh immersed for only seven days in a Tasmanian aquaculture operation decreased by 37% as a result of biofouling.

The biofouling process begins when algae spores, marine invertebrate larvae, and other organic material adhere to surfaces submerged in marine environments (e.g., fish nets in aquaculture). Bacteria then encourage the attachment of secondary unwanted colonizers.

Biofouling has strong negative impacts on aquaculture operations. Water flow and dissolved oxygen are inhibited due to clogged nets in fish pens. The result is often diseased fish from infections, such as netpen liver disease, amoebic gill disease, and parasites. Other negative impacts include increased fish mortalities, decreased fish growth rates, premature fish harvesting, reduced fish product values and profitability, and an adversely impacted environment near fish farms.

Biofouling adds enormous weight to submerged fish netting. Two hundredfold increases in weight have been reported. This translates, for example, to two thousand pounds of unwanted organisms adhered to what was once a clean 10-pound fish pen net. In South Australia, biofouling weighing 6.5 tonnes (approximately 13,000 pounds) was observed on a fish pen net. This extra burden often results in net breakage and additional maintenance costs.

To combat parasites from biofouling in finfish aquaculture, treatment protocols such as cypermethrin, azamethiphos, and emamectin benzoate may be administered, but these have been found to have detrimental environmental effects, for example, in lobster operations.

To treat diseases in fish raised in biofouled nets, fish stocks are administered antibiotics. The antibiotics can have unwanted long-term health effects on consumers and on coastal environments near aquaculture operations. To combat biofouling, operators often implement costly maintenance measures, such as frequent net changing, cleaning/removal of unwanted organisms from nets, net repairs, and chemical treatment including antimicrobial coatings on nylon nets. The cost of antifouling a single salmon net can be several thousand British pounds. In some sectors of the European aquaculture industry, cleaning biofouled fish and shellfish pens can cost 5–20% of its market value. Heavy fouling can reduce the saleable product in nets by 60–90%.

Antifouling coatings are often used on nylon nets because the process is more economical than manual cleaning. When nylon nets are coated with antifouling compounds, the coatings repel biofouling for a period of time, usually between several weeks to several months. However, the nets eventually succumb to biofouling. Antifouling coatings containing cuprous oxide algaecide/biocide are the coatings technology used almost exclusively in the fish farming industry today. The treatments usually flake off within a few weeks to six to eight months.

Biofouled nets are replaced after several months of service, depending on environmental conditions, in a complicated, costly, and labor-intensive operation that involves divers and specialized personnel. During this process, live fish in nets must be transferred to clean pens, which causes undue stress and asphyxiation that results in some loss of fish. Biofouled nets that can be reused are washed on land via manual brushing and scrubbing or high-pressure water hosing. They are then dried and re-impregnated with antifouling coatings.

A line of net cleaners is available for in-situ washings where permitted. But, even where not permitted by environmental, fisheries, maritime, and sanitary authorities, should the lack of dissolved oxygen in submerged pens create an emergency condition that endangers the health of fish, divers may be deployed with special in situ cleaning machinery to scrub biofouled nets.

The aquaculture industry is addressing the negative environmental impacts from its operations (see aquaculture issues). As the industry evolves, a cleaner, more sustainable aquaculture industry is expected to emerge, one that may increasingly rely on materials with anti-fouling, anti-corrosive, and strong structural properties, such as copper alloys.

== Antifouling properties of copper alloys ==
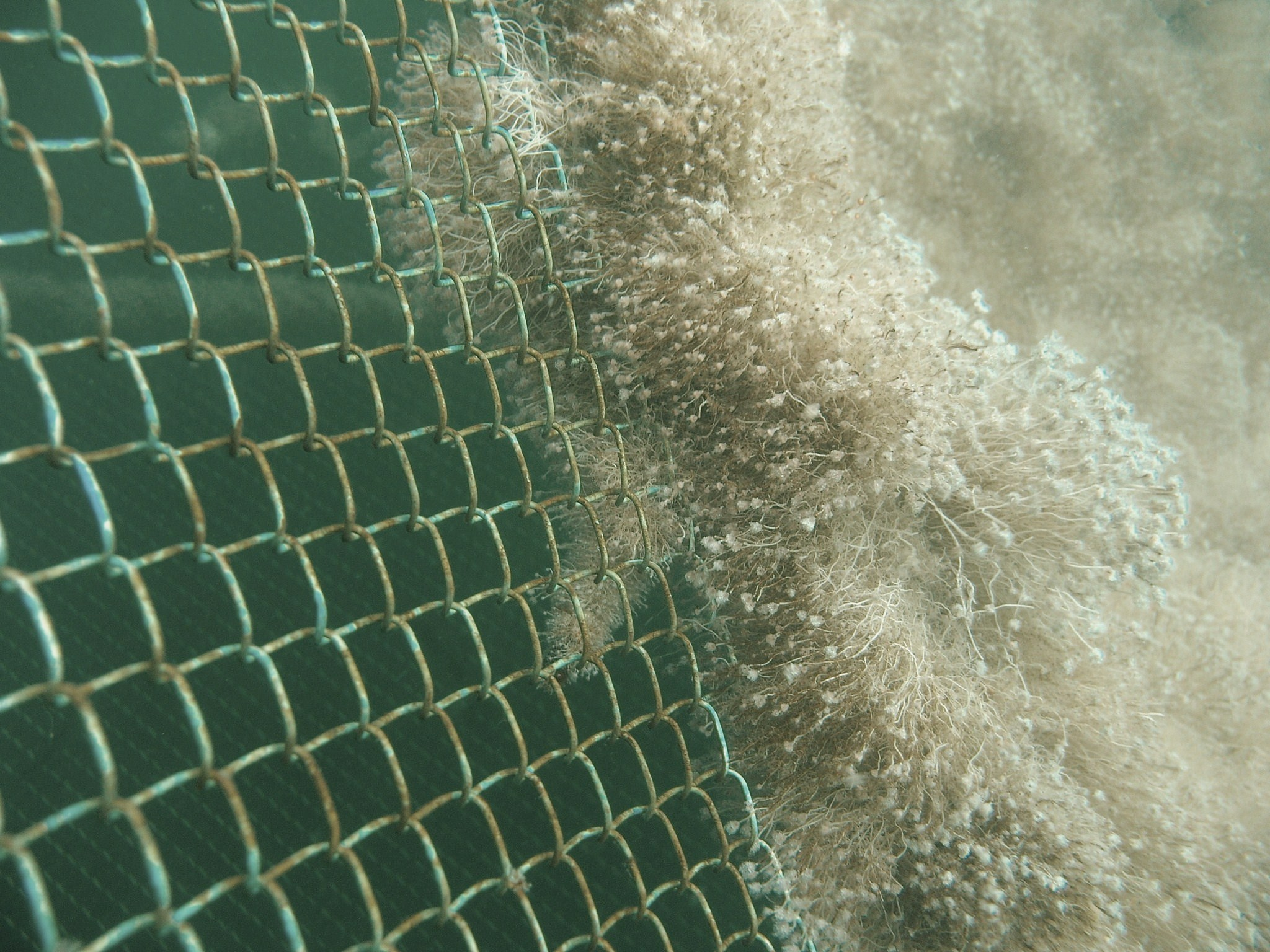
There is no biofouling on a copper alloy mesh after 4 months immersed in the waters of the North Atlantic (foreground), whereas hydroids have grown on high-density polyethylene tubing (background).

In the aquaculture industry, sound animal husbandry translates to keeping fish clean, well fed, healthy, and not overcrowded. One solution to keeping farmed fish healthy is to contain them in antifouling copper alloy nets and structures.

Researchers have attributed copper's resistance to biofouling, even in temperate waters, to two possible mechanisms: 1) a retarding sequence of colonization through release of antimicrobial copper ions, thereby preventing the attachment of microbial layers to marine surfaces; and, 2) separating layers that contain corrosive products and the spores of juveniles or macro-encrusting organisms.

The most important requirement for optimum biofouling resistance is that the copper alloys should be freely exposed or electrically insulated from less noble alloys and from cathodic protection. Galvanic coupling to less noble alloys and cathodic protection prevent copper ion releases from surface films and therefore reduce biofouling resistance.

As temperatures increase and water velocities decrease in marine waters, biofouling rates dramatically rise. However, copper's resistance to biofouling is observed even in temperate waters. Studies in La Herradura Bay, Coquimbo, Chile, where biofouling conditions are extreme, demonstrated that a copper alloy (90% copper, 10% nickel) avoided macro-encrusting organisms.

== Corrosion behavior of copper alloys ==
Copper alloys used in sea water service have low general corrosion rates but also have a high resistance to many localized forms of corrosion. A technical discussion regarding various types of corrosion, application considerations (e.g., depth of installations, effect of polluted waters, sea conditions), and the corrosion characteristics of several copper alloys used in aquaculture netting is available (i.e., copper-nickel, copper-zinc, and copper-silicon).

== Early examples of copper sheathing ==
Prior to the late 1700s, hulls were made almost entirely of wood, often white oak. Sacrificial planking was the common mode of hull protection. This technique included wrapping a protective 1/2-inch thick layer of wood, often pine, on the hull to decrease the risk of damage. This layer was replaced regularly when infested with marine borers. Copper sheathing for bio-resistant ship hulls was developed in the late 18th century. In 1761, the hull of the British Royal Navy's HMS Alarm frigate was fully sheathed in copper to prevent attack by Teredo worms in tropical waters. The copper reduced biofouling of the hull, which enabled ships to move faster than those that did not have copper sheathed hulls.

== Environmental performance of copper alloy mesh ==
Many complicated factors influence the environmental performance of copper alloys in aquaculture operations. A technical description of antibiofouling mechanisms, fish health and welfare, fish losses due to escapes and predator attacks, and reduced life cycle environmental impacts is summarized in this reference.

== Types of copper alloys ==
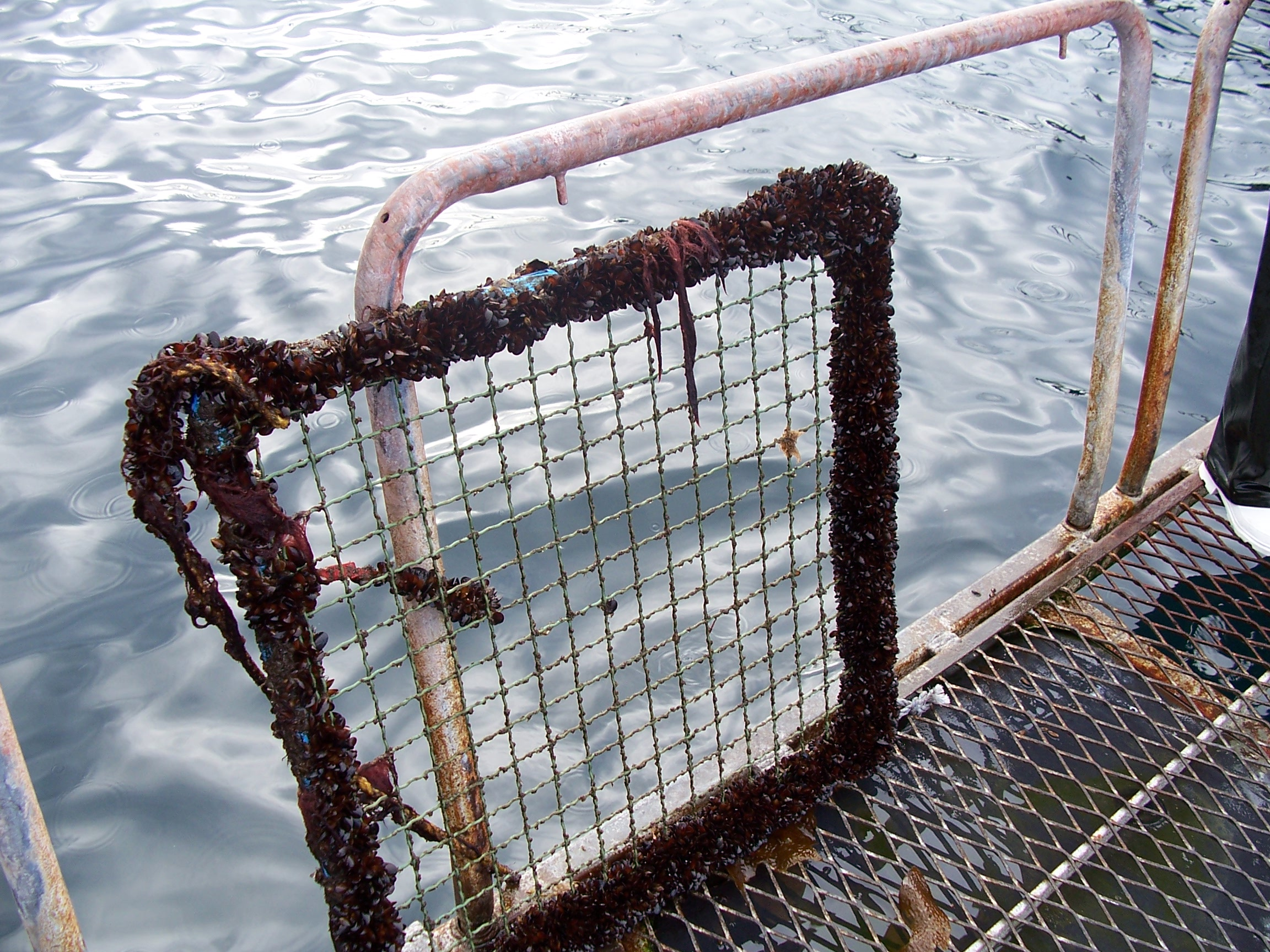
Section of a fish net on a salmon farm near Puerto Montt, Chile. The copper alloy woven mesh inside the frame has resisted biofouling whereas PVC (i.e., the frame around the mesh) is heavily fouled.

Copper–zinc brass alloys are currently (2011) being deployed in commercial-scale aquaculture operations in Asia, South America and the US (Hawaii). Extensive research, including demonstrations and trials, are currently being implemented on two other copper alloys: copper-nickel and copper-silicon. Each of these alloy types has an inherent ability to reduce biofouling, pen waste, disease, and the need for antibiotics while simultaneously maintaining water circulation and oxygen requirements. Other types of copper alloys are also being considered for research and development in aquaculture operations.

The University of New Hampshire is in the midst of conducting experiments under the auspices of the International Copper Association (ICA) to evaluate the structural, hydrodynamic, and antifouling response of copper alloy nets. Factors to be determined from these experiments, such as drag, pen dynamic loads, material loss, and biological growth – well documented for nylon netting but not fully understood for copper-nickel alloy nets – will help to design fish pen enclosures made from these alloys. The East China Sea Fisheries Research Institute, in Shanghai, China, is also conducting experimental investigations on copper alloys for ICA.

=== Copper–zinc alloys ===
The Mitsubishi-Shindoh Co., Ltd., has developed a proprietary copper-zinc brass alloy, called UR30, specifically designed for aquaculture operations. The alloy, which is composed of 64% copper, 35.1% zinc, 0.6% tin, and 0.3% nickel, resists mechanical abrasion when formed into wires and fabricated into chain link, woven, or other types of flexible mesh. Corrosion rates depend on the depth of submersion and seawater conditions. The average reported corrosion rate reported for the alloy is < 5 μm/yr based on two- and five-year exposure trials in seawater.

The Ashimori Industry Company, Ltd., has installed approximately 300 flexible pens with woven chain link UR30 meshes in Japan to raise Seriola (i.e., yellowtail, amberjack, kingfish, hamachi). The company has installed another 32 brass pens to raise Atlantic salmon at the Van Diemen Aquaculture operations in Tasmania, Australia. In Chile, EcoSea Farming S.A. has installed a total of 62 woven chain link brass mesh pens to raise trout and Atlantic salmon. In Panama, China, Korea, Turkey, and the US, demonstrations and trials are underway using flexible pens with woven chain link UR30 and other mesh forms and a range of copper alloys.

To date, in over 10 years of aquaculture experience, chain link mesh fabricated by these brass alloys have not suffered from dezincification, stress corrosion cracking, or erosion corrosion.

=== Copper–nickel alloys ===
Copper–nickel alloys were developed specifically for seawater applications over five decades ago. Today, these alloys are being investigated for their potential use in aquaculture.

Copper–nickel alloys for marine applications are usually 90% copper, 10% nickel, and small amounts of manganese and iron to enhance corrosion resistance. The seawater corrosion resistance of copper–nickel alloys results in a thin, adherent, protective surface film which forms naturally and quickly on the metal upon exposure to clean seawater.

The rate of corrosion protective formation is temperature dependent. For example, at 27 °C (i.e., a common inlet temperature in the Middle East), rapid film formation and good corrosion protection can be expected within a few hours. At 16 °C, it could take 2–3 months for the protection to mature. But once a good surface film forms, corrosion rates decrease, normally to 0.02–0.002 mm/yr, as protective layers develop over a period of years. These alloys have good resistance to chloride pitting and crevice corrosion and are not susceptible to chloride stress corrosion.

=== Copper–silicon alloys ===
Copper–silicon has a long history of use as screws, nuts, bolts, washers, pins, lag bolts, and staples in wooden sailing vessels in marine environments. The alloys are often composed of copper, silicon, and manganese. The inclusion of silicon strengthens the metal.

As with the copper–nickel alloys, corrosion resistance of copper–silicon is due to protective films that form on the surface over a period of time. General corrosion rates of 0.025–0.050mm have been observed in quiet waters. This rate decreases towards the lower end of the range over long-term exposures (e.g., 400–600 days). There is generally no pitting with the silicon-bronzes. Also there is good resistance to erosion corrosion up to moderate flow rates. Because copper–silicon is weldable, rigid pens can be constructed with this material. Also, because welded copper–silicon mesh is lighter than copper-zinc chain link, aquaculture enclosures made with copper–silicon may be lighter in weight and therefore a potentially less expensive alternative.

Luvata Appleton, LLC, is researching and developing a line of copper alloy woven and welded meshes, including a patent-pending copper silicon alloy, that are marketed under the trade name Seawire. Copper-silicon alloy meshes have been developed by the firm to raise various marine organisms in test trials that are now in various stages of evaluation. These include raising cobia in Panama, lobsters in the US state of Maine, and crabs in the Chesapeake Bay. The company is working with various universities to study its material, including the University of Arizona to study shrimp, the University of New Hampshire to study cod, and Oregon State University to study oysters.

== See also ==
- Antimicrobial copper-alloy touch surfaces
- Antimicrobial properties of copper
- Antimicrobial properties of brass

== Other references ==
- Design Guide: Copper Alloy Mesh in Marine Aquaculture, 1984, International Copper Research Association (INCRA) 704/5.
- Metal Corrosion in Boats, Nigel Warren and Adlard Coles, Nautical, 1998.
- Galvanic Corrosion: A Practical Guide for Engineers, R. Francis, 2001, NACE Press.
- Marine Corrosion Causes and Prevention, F. LaQue, John Wiley and Sons, 1975.
- The Selection of Materials for Seawater cooling Systems: A Practical Guide for Engineers, R. Francis, 2006, NACE Press.
- Guidelines for the Use of Copper Alloys in Seawater, A. Tuthill. 1987. CDA/ Nickel Institute Publication.
- The Brasses: Properties and Applications, CDA UK Publication 117.
- Copper in the Ocean Environment, Neal Blossom, American Chemet Corporation.
- ICA Project 438: Experimental usage of copper nickel alloy mesh in aquaculture, Mario E. Edding, Hector Flores, Claudio Miranda, Universidad Catholica del Norte, July 1995
