= Vapour-phase-mediated antimicrobial activity =

The vapour-phase-mediated antimicrobial activity (VMAA) is the inhibitory or cidal antimicrobial activity of a molecule in a liquid culture, following its initial evaporation and migration via the vapour-phase Two new in vitro assays i.e. the vapour-phase-mediated patch assay and the vapour-phase-mediated susceptibility assay were developed to detect and quantify the VMAA. Both assays belong to the newest class of vaporisation assays i.e. the broth microdilution derived vaporisation assays. In contrast, most other vaporisation assays belong to the class of agar disk diffusion derived vaporisation assays and quantify the antimicrobial activity of the vapour-phase itself. Both classes of vaporisation assays are useful and measure different aspects of the antimicrobial capacity of molecules.

== Applications ==
Possible applications for volatiles like volatile organic compounds with VMAA are: maintaining hygiene in hospitals, treating post-harvest contamination, protecting crops against pathogens and pests, and treating infections of the digestive, vaginal or respiratory tract.
