= Cupronickel =

Alloy of copper containing nickel

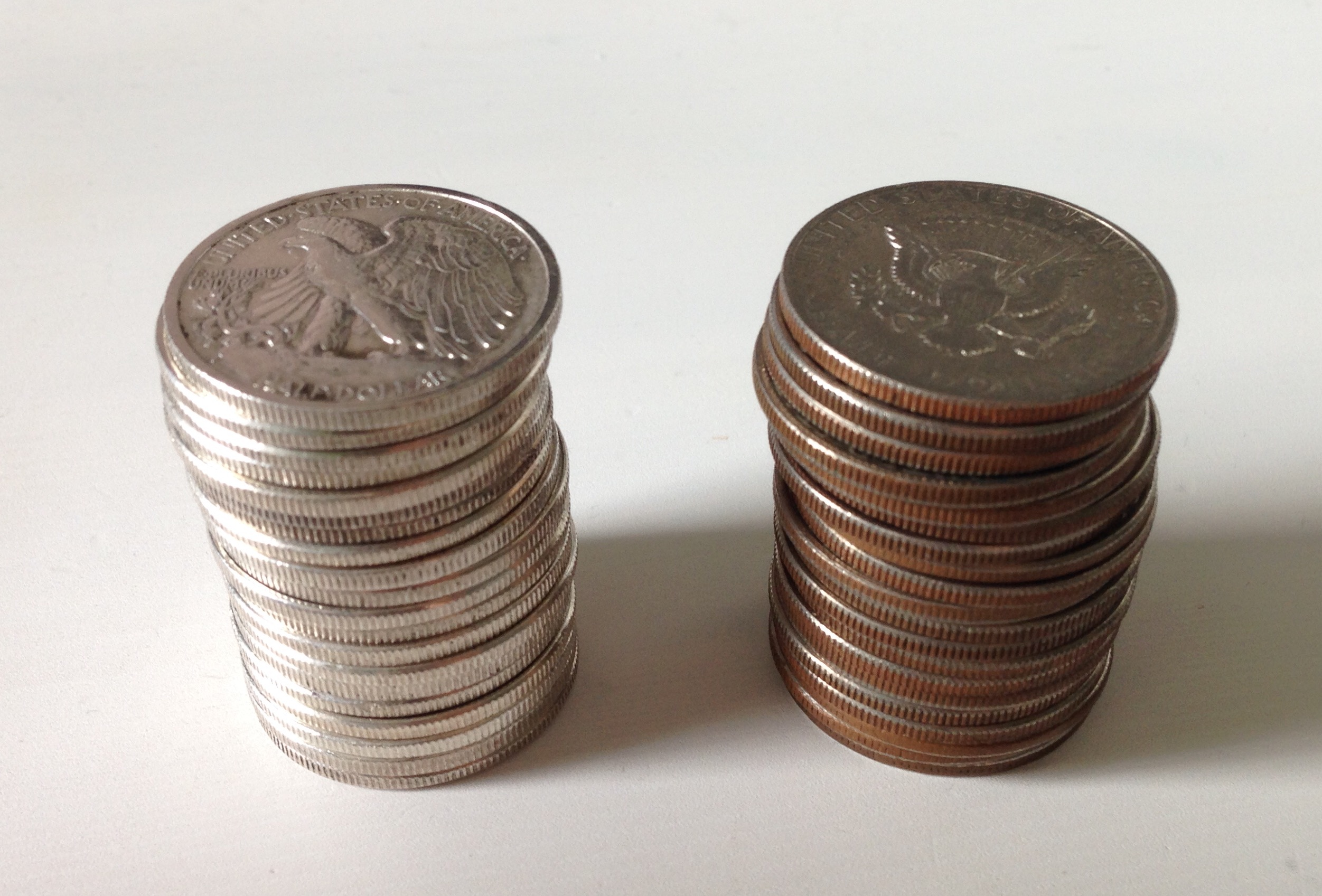
Two stacks of United States Half dollars. The coins in the stack on the right are composed of copper with cupronickel cladding, and can be distinguished from the silver half dollars on the left by their visible copper cores.

Cupronickel or copper–nickel (CuNi) is an alloy of copper with nickel, usually along with small quantities of other metals added for strength, such as iron and manganese. The copper content typically varies from 60 to 90 percent. (Monel is a nickel–copper alloy that contains a minimum of 52 percent nickel.)

Despite its high copper content, cupronickel is silver in colour. Cupronickel is highly resistant to corrosion by salt water, and is therefore used for piping, heat exchangers and condensers in seawater systems, as well as for marine hardware. It is sometimes used for the propellers, propeller shafts, and hulls of high-quality boats. Other uses include military equipment and chemical industry, petrochemical industry, and electrical industries.

In decorative use, a cupronickel alloy called nickel silver is common, although it contains additional zinc but no silver.

Another common 20th-century use of cupronickel was silver-coloured coins. For this use, the typical alloy has 3:1 copper to nickel ratio, with very small amounts of manganese. In the past, true silver coins were debased with cupronickel, such as coins of the pound sterling from 1947 onward having their content replaced.

== Name ==
Cupronickel, as the German Kupfernickel, originally referred to the mineral form of nickel arsenide; natural deposits had superficial similarities to copper ores, and local folklore blamed the sprite Nickel (compare Old Nick) for the absence of usable copper and health issues from arsenic exposure. It was from a sample of this kupfernickel that Baron Axel Fredrik Cronstedt first isolated elemental nickel in 1751, naming the new metal for the sprite. The mineral was given its modern names, nickeline and niccolite, by the mid-19th century.

Aside from cupronickel and copper–nickel, several other terms have been used to describe the material: the tradenames Alpaka or Alpacca, Argentan Minargent, the registered French term cuivre blanc, Chinese silver, and the romanized Cantonese term Paktong, 白銅 (the French and Cantonese terms both meaning "white copper").

Cupronickel alloys containing zinc are referred to as nickel silver, also sometimes hotel silver, German silver, plata alemana (Spanish for "German silver").

== Applications ==
=== Marine engineering ===
Cupronickel alloys are used for marine applications due to their resistance to seawater corrosion, good fabricability, and their effectiveness in lowering macrofouling levels. Alloys ranging in composition from 90% Cu–10% Ni to 70% Cu–30% Ni are commonly specified in heat exchanger or condenser tubes in a wide variety of marine applications.

Important marine applications for cupronickel include:

- Shipbuilding and repair: hulls of boats and ships, seawater cooling, bilge and ballast, sanitary, fire fighting, inert gas, hydraulic and pneumatic chiller systems.
- Desalination plants: brine heaters, heat rejection and recovery, and in evaporator tubing.
- Offshore oil and gas platforms and processing and FPSO vessels: systems and splash zone sheathings.
- Power generation: steam turbine condensers, oil coolers, auxiliary cooling systems and high pressure pre-heaters at nuclear and fossil fuel power plants.
- Seawater system components: condenser and heat exchanger tubes, tube sheets, piping, high pressure systems, fittings, pumps, and water boxes.

=== Coinage ===
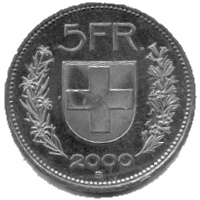
Five Swiss francs

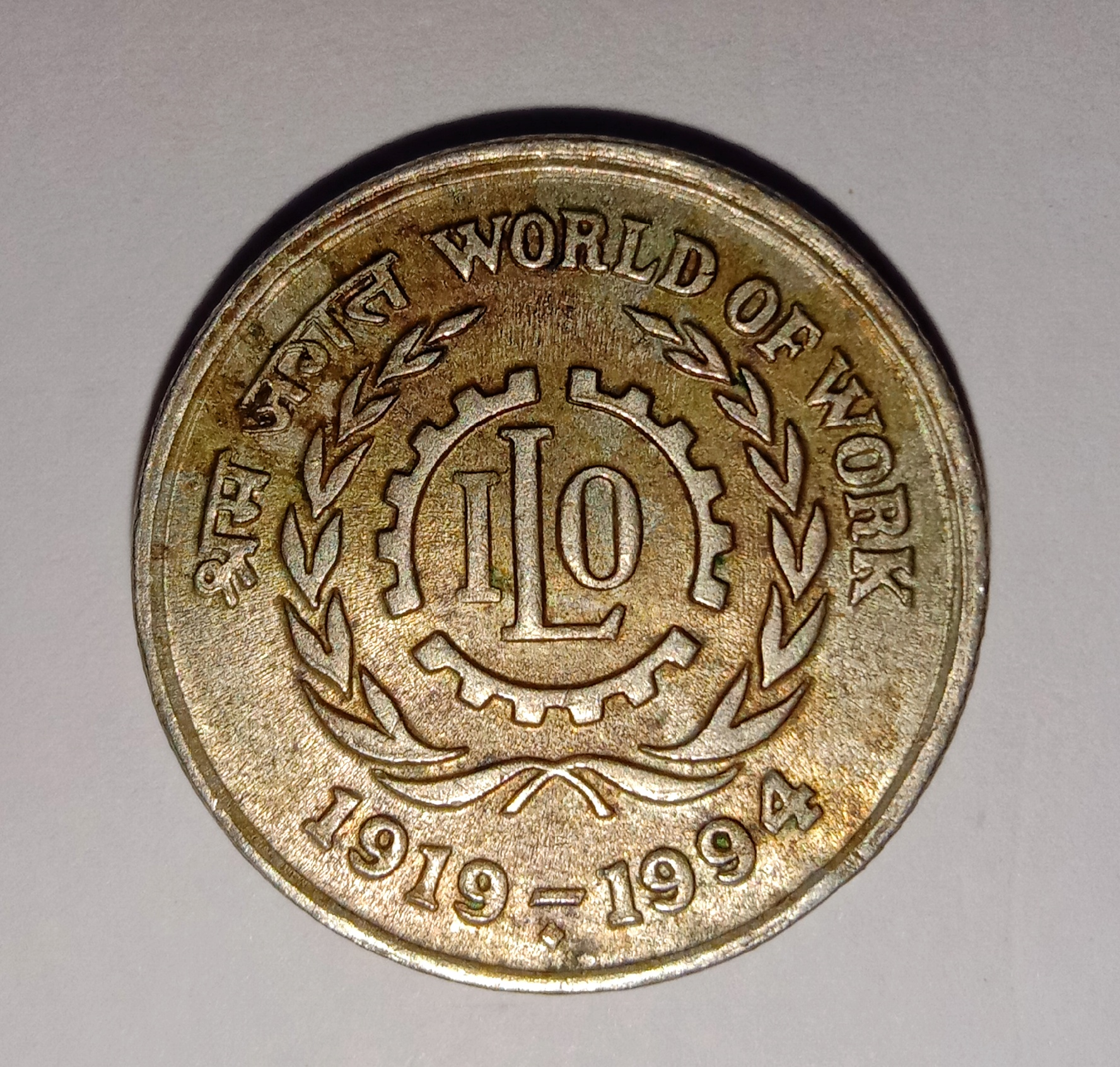
Five Indian rupees, commemorating ILO

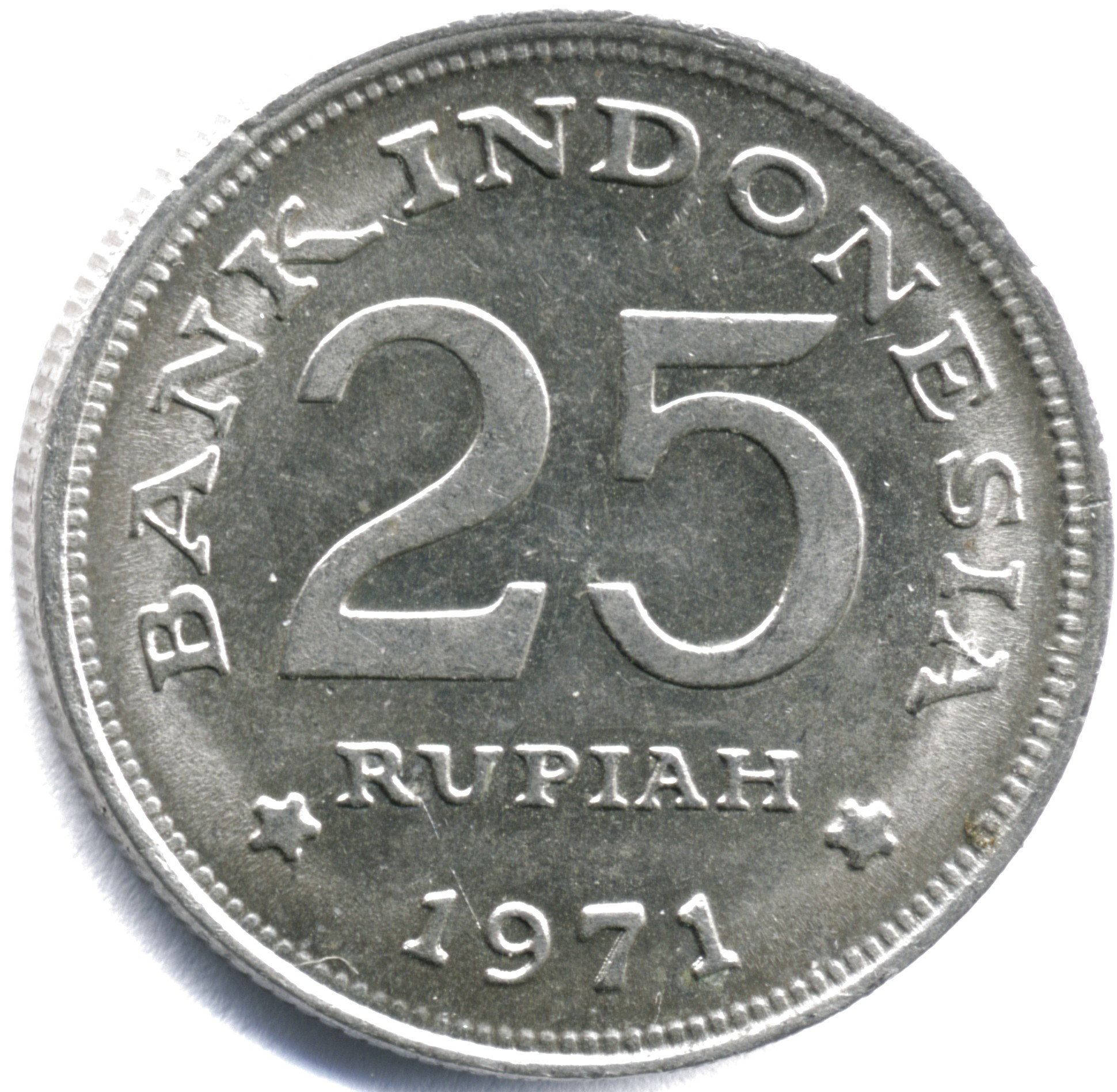
Twenty five Indonesian rupiah

The successful use of cupronickel in coinage is due to its corrosion resistance, electrical conductivity, durability, malleability, low allergy risk, ease of stamping, antimicrobial properties and recyclability.

In Europe, Switzerland pioneered cupronickel-based billon coinage in 1850, with the addition of silver and zinc, for coins of 5, 10 and 20 Rappen. Starting in 1860/1861, Belgium issued 5, 10 and 20 Centimes in pure cupronickel (75% copper, 25% nickel, without additional silver and zinc), and Germany issued 5 and 10 Pfennig in the same 75:25 ratio from 1873/1874 (until 1915/1916). In 1879, Switzerland, for 5 and 10 Rappen coins, also adopted that cheaper 75:25 copper to nickel ratio then being used in Belgium, the United States and Germany. From 1947 to 2012, all "silver" coinage in the UK was made from cupronickel (but from 2012 onwards the two smallest UK cupronickel denominations were replaced with lower-cost nickel-plated steel coins). Moreover, when silver prices rose in the 1960s/1970s also some other European countries replaced remaining silver denominations by cupronickel, e.g. the 1/2 to (pictured) 5 Swiss franc coins starting 1968 and German 5 Deutsche Mark 1975–2001. Since 1999, cupronickel is also used for the inner segment of the 1 euro coin and the outer segment of the 2 euro coin.

In part due to silver hoarding in the Civil War, the United States Mint first used cupronickel for circulating coinage in three-cent pieces starting in 1865, and then for five-cent pieces starting in 1866. Prior to these dates, both denominations had been made only in silver in the United States. Cupronickel is the cladding on either side of United States half-dollars (50¢) since 1971, and all quarters (25¢) and dimes (10¢) made after 1964. Currently, some circulating coins, such as the United States Jefferson nickel (5¢), the Swiss franc, and the South Korean 500 and 100 won are made of solid cupronickel (75:25 ratio).

=== Decorative housewares ===
Nickel silver cupronickels are used extensively as a substitute for silver in tableware and other decorative housewares. Nickel silver is also used as a base for silver plating, where the product is known as electro-plated nickel silver, or EPNS.

=== Other usage ===
A thermocouple junction is formed from a pair of thermocouple conductors such as iron-constantan, copper-constantan or nickel-chromium/nickel-aluminium. The junction may be protected within a sheath of copper, cupronickel or stainless steel.

Cupronickel is used in cryogenic applications. It retains high ductility and thermal conductivity at very low temperatures. Where other metals like steel or aluminum would shatter and become thermally inert, cupronickel's unusual thermal and mechanical performance at these low temperatures facilitate a number of niche uses. Machinery that must perform many duty cycles at continuously low-temperatures and heat exchangers at cryogenic plants are the main industrial destinations of cupronickel in cryogenic applications. Niche applications also exist, for example the alloy's high thermal conductivity at low temperatures has made cupronickel ubiquitous in freeze branding operations.

In the early 20th century, this material was used to make bullet jackets. But it was soon replaced by gilding metal to reduce metal contamination of the barrel bore.

Currently, cupronickel and nickel silver remain the basic material for silver-plated cutlery. It is commonly used for mechanical and electrical equipment, medical equipment, zippers, jewelry items, and both for strings for instruments in the violin family, and for guitar frets. Fender Musical Instruments used "CuNiFe" magnets in their "Wide Range Humbucker" pickup for various Telecaster and Starcaster guitars during the 1970s.

For high-quality cylinder locks and locking systems, cylinder cores are made from wear-resistant cupronickel.

Cupronickel has been used as an alternative to traditional steel hydraulic brake lines (the pipes containing the brake fluid), as it does not rust. Since cupronickel is much softer than steel, it bends and flares more easily, and the same property allows it to form a better seal with hydraulic components.

== Physical and mechanical properties ==
Cupronickel lacks a copper color due to nickel's high electronegativity, which causes a loss of one electron in copper's d-shell (leaving 9 electrons in the d-shell versus pure copper's typical 10 electrons).

Important properties of cupronickel alloys include corrosion resistance, inherent resistance to macrofouling, good tensile strength, excellent ductility when annealed, thermal conductivity and expansion characteristics amenable for heat exchangers and condensers, good thermal conductivity and ductility at antimicrobial touch surface properties.

Properties of some Cu–Ni alloys
Alloy UNS No.	Common name	European spec	Ni	Fe	Mn	Cu	Density g/cm^{3}	Melting point deg C	Spec heat J/(kg·K)	Thermal conductivity W/(m·K)	TEC μm/(m·K)	Electrical resistivity μOhm·cm	Elastic modulus GPa	Yield strength MPa	Tensile strength MPa	Linear expansion 10^{6}/deg K	Modulus rigidity GPa
C70600	90–10	Cu_{90}Ni_{10}	9–11	1–1.8	1	Balance	8.9	1100–1145	377	40	17	19	135	105	275	17	50
C71500	70–30	Cu_{70}Ni_{30}	29–33	0.4–1.0	1	Balance	8.95	1170–1240	377	29	16	34	152	125	360	16	56
C71640	66–30–2–2	Cu_{66}Ni_{30}Fe_{2}Mn_{2}	29–32	1.7–2.3	1.5–2.5	Balance	8.86			25	15.5	50	156	170	435		

Subtle differences in corrosion resistance and strength determine which alloy is selected. Descending the table, the maximum allowable flow rate in piping increases, as does the tensile strength.

In seawater, the alloys have excellent corrosion rates which remain low as long as the maximum design flow velocity is not exceeded. This velocity depends on geometry and pipe diameter. They have high resistance to crevice corrosion, stress corrosion cracking and hydrogen embrittlement that can be troublesome to other alloy systems. Copper–nickels naturally form a thin protective surface layer over the first several weeks of exposure to seawater and this provides its ongoing resistance. Additionally, they have a high inherent biofouling resistance to attachment by macrofoulers (e.g. seagrasses and molluscs) living in the seawater. To use this property to its full potential, the alloy needs to be free of the effects of, or insulated from, any form of cathodic protection.

However, Cu–Ni alloys can show high corrosion rates in polluted or stagnant seawater when sulfides or ammonia are present. It is important, therefore, to avoid exposure to such conditions, particularly during commissioning and refit while the surface films are maturing. Ferrous sulfate dosing to sea water systems can provide improved resistance.

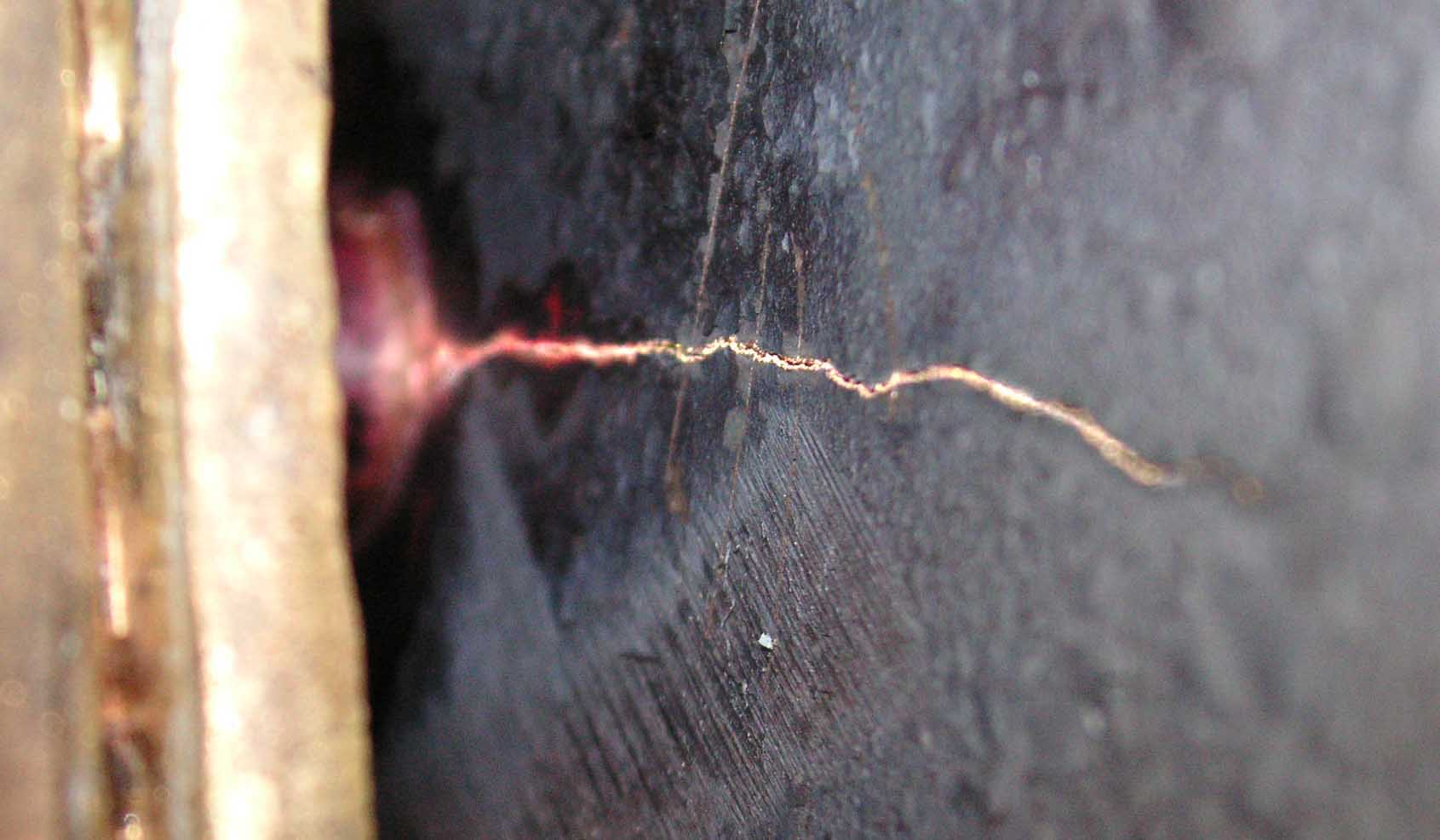
Crack in 90–10 Cu–Ni metal plate due to stresses during silver brazing

As copper and nickel alloy with each other easily and have simple structures, the alloys are ductile and readily fabricated. Strength and hardness for each individual alloy is increased by cold working; they are not hardened by heat treatment. Joining of 90–10 (C70600) and 70–30 (C71500) is possible by both welding or brazing. They are both weldable by the majority of techniques, although autogenous (welding without weld consumables) or oxyacetylene methods are not recommended. The 70–30 rather than 90–10 weld consumables are normally preferred for both alloys and no after-welding heat treatment is required. They can also be welded directly to steel, providing a 65% nickel–copper weld consumable is used to avoid iron dilution effects. The C71640 alloy tends to be used as seamless tubing and expanded rather than welded into the tube plate. Brazing requires appropriate silver-base brazing alloys. However, great care must be taken to ensure that there are no stresses in the Cu–Ni being silver brazed, since any stress can cause intergranular penetration of the brazing material, and severe stress cracking (see image). Thus, full annealing of any potential mechanical stress is necessary.

Applications for Cu–Ni alloys have withstood the test of time, as they are still widely used and range from seawater system piping, condensers and heat exchangers in naval vessels, commercial shipping, multiple-stage flash desalination and power stations. They have also been used as splash zone cladding on offshore structures and protective cladding on boat hulls, as well as for solid hulls themselves.

== Fabrication ==
Due to its ductility, cupronickel alloys can be readily fabricated in a wide variety of product forms and fittings. Cupronickel tubing can be readily expanded into tube sheets for the manufacturing of shell and tube heat exchangers.

Details of fabrication procedures, including general handling, cutting and machining, forming, heat treatment, preparing for welding, weld preparations, tack welding, welding consumables, welding processes, painting, mechanical properties of welds, and tube and pipe bending are available.

== Standards ==
ASTM, EN, and ISO standards exist for ordering wrought and cast forms of cupronickel.

Thermocouples and resistors whose resistance is stable across changes in temperature contain alloy constantan, which consists of 55% copper and 45% nickel.

== History ==
=== Chinese history ===
Cupronickel alloys were known as "white copper" to the Chinese since about the third century BC. Some weapons made during the Warring States period were made with Cu-Ni alloys. The theory of Chinese origins of Bactrian cupronickel was suggested in 1868 by Flight, who found that the coins considered the oldest cupronickel coins yet discovered were of a very similar alloy to Chinese paktong.

The author-scholar, Ho Wei, precisely described the process of making cupronickel in about 1095 AD. The paktong alloy was described as being made by adding small pills of naturally occurring yunnan ore to a bath of molten copper. When a crust of slag formed, saltpeter was added, the alloy was stirred and the ingot was immediately cast. Zinc is mentioned as an ingredient but there are no details about when it was added. The ore used is noted as solely available from Yunnan, according to the story:

"San Mao Chun were at Tanyang during a famine year when many people died, so taking certain chemicals, Ying projected them onto silver, turning it into gold, and he also transmuted iron into silver – thus enabling the lives of many to be saved [through purchasing grain through this fake silver and gold] Thereafter all those who prepared chemical powders by heating and transmuting copper by projection called their methods "Tanyang techniques".

The late Ming and Qing literature have very little information about paktong. However, it is first mentioned specifically by name in the Thien Kung Khai Wu of circa 1637:

"When lu kan shih (zinc carbonate, calamine) or wo chhein (zinc metal) is mixed and combined with chih thung (copper), one gets 'yellow bronze' (ordinary brass). When phi shang and other arsenic substances are heated with it, one gets 'white bronze' or white copper: pai thong. When alum and niter and other chemicals are mixed together one gets ching thung: green bronze."

Ko Hung stated in 300 AD: "The Tanyang copper was created by throwing a mercuric elixir into Tanyang copper and heated- gold will be formed." However, the Pha Phu Tsu and the Shen I Ching describing a statue in the Western provinces as being of silver, tin, lead and Tanyang copper – which looked like gold, and could be forged for plating and inlaying vessels and swords.

Joseph Needham et al. argue that cupronickel was at least known as a unique alloy by the Chinese during the reign of Liu An in 120 BC in Yunnan. Moreover, the Yunnanese State of Tien was founded in 334 BC as a colony of the Chu. Most likely, modern paktong was unknown to Chinese of the day – but the naturally occurring Yunnan ore cupronickel alloy was likely a valuable internal trade commodity.

=== Greco-Bactrian coinage ===
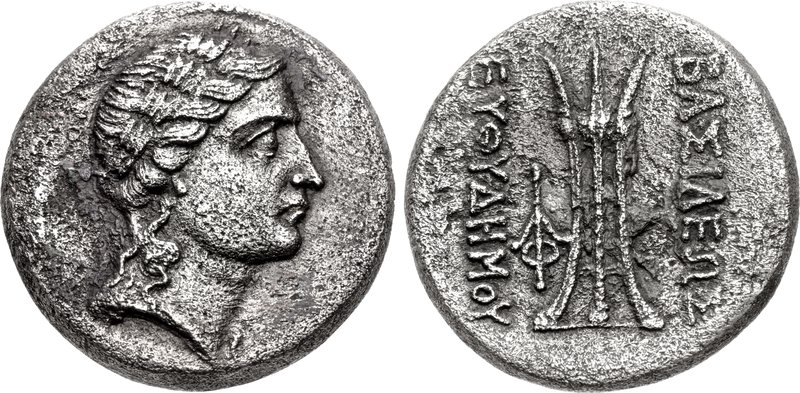
A cupro-nickel coin of king Euthydemus II, c. 185–180 BC. Notice the coin looks more corroded than the usual silver coins.

In 1868, W. Flight discovered a Greco-Bactrian coin comprising 20% nickel that dated from 180 to 170 BCE with the bust of Euthydemus II on the obverse. Coins of a similar alloy with busts of his younger brothers, Pantaleon and Agathocles, were minted around 170 BCE. The composition of the coins was later verified using the traditional wet method and X-ray fluorescence spectrometry. Cunningham in 1873 proposed the "Bactrian nickel theory", which suggested that the coins must have been the result of overland trade from China through India to Greece. Cunningham's theory was supported by scholars such as W. W. Tarn, Sir John Marshall, and J. Newton Friend, but was criticized by E. R. Caley and S. van R. Cammann.

In 1973, Cheng and Schwitter in their new analyses suggested that the Bactrian alloys (copper, lead, iron, nickel and cobalt) were closely similar to the Chinese paktong, and of nine known Asian nickel deposits, only those in China could provide the identical chemical compositions. Cammann criticized Cheng and Schwitter's paper, arguing that the decline of cupronickel currency should not have coincided with the opening of the Silk Road. If the Bactrian nickel theory were true, according to Cammann, the Silk Road would have increased the supply of cupronickel. However, the end of Greco-Bactrian cupronickel currency could be attributed to other factors such as the end of the House of Euthydemus.

=== European history ===
The alloy seems to have been rediscovered by the West during alchemy experiments. Notably, Andreas Libavius, in his Alchemia of 1597, mentions a surface-whitened copper aes album by mercury or silver. But in De Natura Metallorum in Singalarum Part 1, published in 1599, the same term was applied to "tin" from the East Indies (modern-day Indonesia and the Philippines) and given the Spanish name, tintinaso.

Richard Watson of Cambridge appears to be the first to discover that cupronickel was an alloy of three metals. In attempting to rediscover the secret of white-copper, Watson critiqued Jean-Baptiste Du Halde's History of China (1688) as confusing the term paktong. He noted the Chinese of his day did not form it as an alloy but rather smelted readily available unprocessed ore:

"...appeared from a vast series of experiments made at Peking- that it occurred naturally as an ore mined at the region, the most extraordinary copper is pe-tong or white copper: it is white when dug out of the mine and even more white within than without. It appears, by a vast number of experiments made at Peking, that its colour is owing to no mixture; on the contrary, all mixtures diminish its beauty, for, when it is rightly managed it looks exactly like silver and were there not a necessity of mixing a little tutenag or such metal to soften it, it would be so much more the extraordinary as this sort of copper is found nowhere but in China and that only in the Province of Yunnan". Notwithstanding what is here said, of the colour of the copper being owing to no mixture, it is certain the Chinese white copper as brought to us, is a mixt [sic: mixed] metal; so that the ore from which it was extracted must consist of various metallic substances; and from such ore that the natural orichalcum if it ever existed, was made."

During the peak European importation of Chinese white-copper from 1750 to 1800, increased attention was made to its discovering its constituents. Peat and Cookson found that "the darkest proved to contain 7.7% nickel and the lightest said to be indistinguishable from silver with a characteristic bell-like resonance when struck and considerable resistance to corrosion, 11.1%".

Another trial by Andrew Fyfe estimated the nickel content at 31.6%. Guesswork ended when James Dinwiddie of the Macartney Embassy brought back in 1793, at considerable personal risk (smuggling of paktong ore was a capital crime by the Chinese Emperor), some of the ore from which paktong was made. Cupronickel became widely understood, as published by E. Thomason, in 1823, in a submission, later rejected for not being new knowledge, to the Royal Society of Arts.

Efforts in Europe to exactly duplicate the Chinese paktong failed due to a general lack of requisite complex cobalt–nickel–arsenic naturally occurring ore. However, the Schneeberg district of Germany, where the famous Blaufarbenwerke made cobalt blue and other pigments, solely held the requisite complex cobalt–nickel–arsenic ores in Europe.

At the same time, the Prussian Verein zur Beförderung des Gewerbefleißes (Society for the Improvement of Business Diligence/Industriousness) offered a prize for the mastery of the process. Dr E.A. Geitner and J.R. von Gersdoff of Schneeberg won the prize and launched their "German silver" brand under the trade names Argentan and Neusilber (new silver).

In 1829, Percival Norton Johnston persuaded Dr. Geitner to establish a foundry in Bow Common behind Regents' Park Canal in London, and obtained ingots of nickel-silver with the composition 18% Ni, 55% Cu and 27% Zn.

Between 1829 and 1833, Percival Norton Johnson was the first person to refine cupronickel on the British Isles. He became a wealthy man, producing in excess of 16.5 tonnes per year. The alloy was mainly made into cutlery by the Birmingham firm William Hutton and sold under the trade-name "Argentine".

Johnsons' most serious competitors, Charles Askin and Brok Evans, under the chemist Dr. EW Benson, devised greatly improved methods of cobalt and nickel suspension and marketed their own brand of nickel-silver, called "British Plate".

John Fairfield Thompson writes that the 3:1 copper-nickel alloy was developed for coinage by Belgium in 1860. In 1866, the US Congress passed a law authorizing the creation of a 3-cent coin consisting of 75% copper and 25% nickel, and the nickel, as it became known, was created. Brazil adopted the alloy for coin in 1870, and Imperial Germany followed in 1873. France and Greece adopted of this technology in the 20th century.

After the unification of Germany cupronickel coinage was introduced by the German Coinage Act, and sudden demand of nickel for tens of millions of 5 and 10 pfennig coins minted in 1873-1876 caused such a shock on the previously tranquil market that price more than tripled, leading to a significant expansion of supply.

By 1902 the alloy was used in the UK for bullet jackets.

By the 1920s, a 70–30 copper–nickel grade was developed for naval condensers. Soon afterwards, a 2% manganese and 2% iron alloy now known as alloy C71640 was introduced for a UK power station which needed better erosion resistance because the levels of entrained sand in the seawater. A 90–10 alloy first became available in the 1950s, initially for seawater piping, and is now the more widely used alloy for this purpose.

== See also ==
- Brass (copper alloyed with zinc)
- Bronze (copper alloyed with tin)
- Copper alloys in aquaculture
- Freeze branding
- Nordic gold
