= Antimicrobial properties of copper =

Abilities of copper to kill or stop the growth of microorganisms

Copper and its alloys (brasses, bronzes, cupronickel, copper-nickel-zinc, and others) are natural antimicrobial materials. Ancient civilizations exploited the antimicrobial properties of copper long before the concept of microbes became understood in the nineteenth century. In addition to several copper medicinal preparations, it was also observed centuries ago that water contained in copper vessels or transported in copper conveyance systems was of better quality (i.e., no or little visible slime or biofouling formation) than water contained or transported in other materials.

The antimicrobial properties of copper are still under active investigation. Molecular mechanisms responsible for the antibacterial action of copper have been a subject of intensive research. Scientists are also actively demonstrating the intrinsic efficacy of copper alloy "touch surfaces" to destroy a wide range of microorganisms that threaten public health.

== Mechanisms of action ==
In 1852, Victor Burq discovered that those working with copper had far fewer deaths to cholera than anyone else, and did extensive research confirming this. In 1867, he presented his findings to the French Academies of Science and Medicine, informing them that putting copper on the skin was effective at preventing someone from getting cholera.

The oligodynamic effect was discovered in 1893 as a toxic effect of metal ions on living cells, algae, molds, spores, fungi, viruses, prokaryotic, and eukaryotic microorganisms, even in relatively low concentrations. This antimicrobial effect is shown by ions of copper as well as mercury, silver, iron, lead, zinc, bismuth, gold, and aluminium.

In 1973, researchers at Battelle Columbus Laboratories conducted a comprehensive literature, technology, and patent search that traced the history of understanding the "bacteriostatic and sanitizing properties of copper and copper alloy surfaces", which demonstrated that copper, in very small quantities, has the power to control a wide range of molds, fungi, algae, and harmful microbes. Of the 312 citations mentioned in the review across the time period 1892–1973, the observations below are noteworthy:

- Copper inhibits Actinomucor elegans, Aspergillus niger, Bacterium linens, Bacillus megaterium, Bacillus subtilis, Brevibacterium erythrogenes, Candida utilis, Penicillium chrysogenum, Rhizopus niveus, Saccharomyces mandshuricus, and Saccharomyces cerevisiae in concentrations above 10 g/L.
- Candida utilis (formerly, Torulopsis utilis) is completely inhibited at 0.04 g/L copper concentrations.
- Tubercle bacillus is inhibited by copper as simple cations or complex anions in concentrations from 0.02 to 0.2 g/L.
- Achromobacter fischeri and Photobacterium phosphoreum growth is inhibited by metallic copper.
- Paramecium caudatum cell division is reduced by copper plates placed on Petri dish covers containing infusoria and nutrient media.
- Poliovirus is inactivated within ten minutes of exposure to copper with ascorbic acid.

A subsequent paper probed some of copper's antimicrobial mechanisms and cited no fewer than 120 investigations into the efficacy of copper's action on microbes. The authors noted that the antimicrobial mechanisms are very complex and take place in many ways, both inside cells and in the interstitial spaces between cells.

Examples of some of the molecular mechanisms noted by various researchers include the following:

- The 3-dimensional structure of proteins can be altered by copper, so that the proteins can no longer perform their normal functions. The result is inactivation of bacteria or viruses.
- Copper complexes form radicals that inactivate viruses.
- Copper may disrupt enzyme structures, and functions by binding to sulfur- or carboxylate-containing groups and amino groups of proteins.
- Copper may interfere with other essential elements, such as zinc and iron.
- Copper facilitates deleterious activity in superoxide radicals. Repeated redox reactions on site-specific macromolecules generate HO• radicals, thereby causing "multiple hit damage" at target sites.
- Copper can interact with lipids, causing their peroxidation and opening holes in the cell membranes, thereby compromising the integrity of cells. This can cause leakage of essential solutes, which in turn, can have a desiccating effect.
- Copper damages the respiratory chain in Escherichia coli cells. and is associated with impaired cellular metabolism.
- Faster corrosion correlates with faster inactivation of microorganisms. This may be due to increased availability of cupric ion, Cu2+, which is believed to be responsible for the antimicrobial action.
- In inactivation experiments on the flu strain, H1N1, which is nearly identical to the H5N1 avian strain and the 2009 H1N1 (swine flu) strain, researchers hypothesized that copper's antimicrobial action probably attacks the overall structure of the virus and therefore has a broad-spectrum effect.
- Microbes require copper-containing enzymes to drive certain vital chemical reactions. Excess copper, however, can affect proteins and enzymes in microbes, thereby inhibiting their activities. Researchers believe that excess copper has the potential to disrupt cell function both inside cells and in the interstitial spaces between cells, probably acting on the outer envelope of cells.

Currently, researchers believe that the most important antimicrobial mechanisms for copper are as follows:

- Elevated copper levels inside a cell causes oxidative stress and the generation of hydrogen peroxide. Under these conditions, copper participates in the so-called Fenton-type reaction — a chemical reaction causing oxidative damage to cells.
- Excess copper causes a decline in the membrane integrity of microbes, leading to leakage of specific essential cell nutrients, such as potassium and glutamate. This leads to desiccation and subsequent cell death.
- While copper is needed for many protein functions, in an excess situation (as on a copper alloy surface), copper binds to proteins that do not require copper for their function. This "inappropriate" binding leads to loss-of-function of the protein, and/or breakdown of the protein into nonfunctional portions.

These potential mechanisms and others are the subject of continuing study by academic research laboratories worldwide.

== Antimicrobial efficacy of copper alloy touch surfaces ==
Copper alloy surfaces have intrinsic properties that destroy many microorganisms. In the interest of protecting public health, especially in healthcare environments with their susceptible patient populations, an abundance of peer-reviewed antimicrobial efficacy studies have been conducted in the past ten years regarding copper's efficacy to destroy E. coli O157:H7, methicillin-resistant Staphylococcus aureus (MRSA), Staphylococcus, Clostridioides difficile, influenza A virus, adenovirus, and fungi. Stainless steel was also investigated because it is an important surface material in today's healthcare environments. The studies cited here, plus others directed by the United States Environmental Protection Agency, resulted in the 2008 registration of 274 different copper alloys as certified antimicrobial materials that have public health benefits.

=== E. coli ===
E. coli O157:H7 is a potent, highly infectious, ACDP (Advisory Committee on Dangerous Pathogens, UK) Hazard Group 3 foodborne and waterborne pathogen. The bacterium produces potent toxins that cause diarrhea, severe aches, and nausea in infected persons. Symptoms of severe infections include hemolytic colitis (bloody diarrhea), hemolytic uremic syndrome (kidney disease), and death. E. coli O157:H7 has become a serious public health threat because of its increased incidence and because children up to 14 years of age, the elderly, and immunocompromised individuals are at risk of incurring the most severe symptoms.

==== Efficacy on copper surfaces ====
Recent studies have shown that copper alloy surfaces kill E. coli O157:H7. More than 99.9% of E. coli microbes are killed after just 1–2 hours on copper. On stainless steel surfaces, the microbes can survive for weeks.

Results of E. coli O157:H7 destruction on an alloy containing 99.9% copper (C11000) demonstrate that this pathogen is rapidly and almost completely killed (more than 99.9% kill rate) within ninety minutes at room temperature (20 °C). At chill temperatures (4 °C), more than 99.9% of E. coli O157:H7 are killed within 270 minutes. E. coli O157:H7 destruction on several copper alloys containing 99%–100% copper (including C10200, C11000, C18080, and C19700) at room temperature begins within minutes. At chilled temperatures, the inactivation process takes about an hour longer. No significant reduction in the amount of viable E. coli O157:H7 occurs on stainless steel after 270 minutes.

Studies have examined the E. coli O157:H7 bactericidal efficacies on 25 different copper alloys to identify those alloys that provide the best combination of antimicrobial activity, corrosion/oxidation resistance, and fabrication properties. Copper's antibacterial effect was found to be intrinsic in all of the copper alloys tested. As in previous studies, no antibacterial properties were observed on stainless steel (UNS S30400). Also, in confirmation with earlier studies, the rate of drop-off of E. coli O157:H7 on the copper alloys is faster at room temperature than at chill temperature.

For the most part, the bacterial kill rate of copper alloys increased with increasing copper content of the alloy. This is further evidence of copper's intrinsic antibacterial properties.

==== Efficacy on brass, bronze, copper-nickel alloys ====
Brasses, which were frequently used for doorknobs and push plates in decades past, also demonstrate bactericidal efficacies, but within a somewhat longer time frame than pure copper. All nine brasses tested were almost completely bactericidal (more than 99.9% kill rate) at 20 °C within 60–270 minutes. Many brasses were almost completely bactericidal at 4 °C within 180–360 minutes.

The rate of total microbial death on four bronzes varied from within 50–270 minutes at 20 °C, and from 180 to 270 minutes at 4 °C.

The kill rate of E. coli O157 on copper-nickel alloys increased with increasing copper content. Zero bacterial counts at room temperature were achieved after 105–360 minutes for five of the six alloys. Despite not achieving a complete kill, alloy C71500 achieved a 4-log drop within the six-hour test, representing a 99.99% reduction in the number of live organisms.

==== Efficacy on stainless steel ====
Unlike copper alloys, stainless steel (S30400) does not exhibit any degree of bactericidal properties against E. coli O157:H7. This material, which is one of the most common touch surface materials in the healthcare industry, allows toxic E. coli O157:H7 to remain viable for weeks. Near-zero bacterial counts are not observed even after 28 days of investigation. Epifluorescence photographs have demonstrated that E. coli O157:H7 is almost completely killed on copper alloy C10200 after just 90 minutes at 20 °C; whereas a substantial number of pathogens remain on stainless steel S30400.

=== MRSA ===
Methicillin-resistant Staphylococcus aureus (MRSA) is a dangerous bacteria strain because it is resistant to beta-lactam antibiotics. Recent strains of the bacteria, EMRSA-15 and EMRSA-16, are highly transmissible and durable. This is of extreme importance to those concerned with reducing the incidence of hospital-acquired MRSA infections.

In 2008, after evaluating a wide body of research mandated specifically by the United States Environmental Protection Agency (EPA), registration approvals were granted by EPA in 2008 granting that copper alloys kill more than 99.9% of MRSA within two hours.

Subsequent research conducted at the University of Southampton (UK) compared the antimicrobial efficacies of copper and several non-copper proprietary coating products to kill MRSA. At 20 °C, the drop-off in MRSA organisms on copper alloy C11000 is dramatic and almost complete (more than 99.9% kill rate) within 75 minutes. However, neither a triclosan-based product nor two silver-based antimicrobial treatments (Ag-A and Ag-B) exhibited any meaningful efficacy against MRSA. Stainless steel S30400 did not exhibit any antimicrobial efficacy.

In 2004, the University of Southampton research team was the first to clearly demonstrate that copper inhibits MRSA. On copper alloys — C19700 (99% copper), C24000 (80% copper), and C77000 (55% copper) — significant reductions in viability were achieved at room temperatures after 1.5 hours, 3.0 hours, and 4.5 hours, respectively. Faster antimicrobial efficacies were associated with higher copper alloy content. Stainless steel did not exhibit any bactericidal benefits.

Leyland Nigel S., Podporska-Carroll Joanna, Browne John, Hinder Steven J., Quilty Brid, Pillai Suresh C. (2016). "Highly Efficient F, Cu doped TiO2 anti-bacterial visible light active photocatalytic coatings to combat hospital-acquired infections". Scientific Reports. 6 24770. Bibcode:2016NatSR...624770L. doi:10.1038/srep24770. PMC 4838873. PMID 27098010.

=== Clostridioides difficile ===
Clostridioides difficile, an anaerobic bacterium, is a major cause of potentially life-threatening disease, including nosocomial diarrheal infections, especially in developed countries. C. difficile endospores can survive up to five months on surfaces. The pathogen is frequently transmitted by the hands of healthcare workers in hospital environments. C. difficile is currently a leading hospital-acquired infection in the UK, and rivals MRSA as the most common organism to cause hospital-acquired infections in the U.S. It is responsible for a series of intestinal health complications, often referred to collectively as Clostridioides difficile Associated Disease (CDAD).

The antimicrobial efficacy of various copper alloys against Clostridioides difficile was recently evaluated. The viability of C. difficile spores and vegetative cells were studied on copper alloys C11000 (99.9% copper), C51000 (95% copper), C70600 (90% copper), C26000 (70% copper), and C75200 (65% copper). Stainless steel (S30400) was used as the experimental control. The copper alloys significantly reduced the viability of both C. difficile spores and vegetative cells. On C75200, near total kill was observed after one hour (however, at six hours total C. difficile increased, and decreased slower afterward). On C11000 and C51000, near total kill was observed after three hours, then total kill in 24 hours on C11000 and 48 hours on C51000. On C70600, near total kill was observed after five hours. On C26000, near total kill was achieved after 48 hours. On stainless steel, no reductions in viable organisms were observed after 72 hours (three days) of exposure and no significant reduction was observed within 168 hours (one week).

=== Influenza A ===
Influenza, commonly known as flu, is an infectious disease from a viral pathogen different from the one that produces the common cold. Symptoms of influenza, which are much more severe than the common cold, include fever, sore throat, muscle pains, severe headache, coughing, weakness, and general discomfort. Influenza can cause pneumonia, which can be fatal, particularly in young children and the elderly.

After incubation for one hour on copper, active influenza A virus particles were reduced by 75%. After six hours, the particles were reduced on copper by 99.999%. Influenza A virus was found to survive in large numbers on stainless steel.

Once surfaces are contaminated with virus particles, fingers can transfer particles to up to seven other clean surfaces. Because of copper's ability to destroy influenza A virus particles, copper can help to prevent cross-contamination of this viral pathogen.

=== Adenovirus ===
Adenovirus is a group of viruses that infect the tissue lining membranes of the respiratory and urinary tracts, eyes, and intestines. Adenoviruses account for about 10% of acute respiratory infections in children. These viruses are a frequent cause of diarrhea.

In a recent study, 75% of adenovirus particles were inactivated on copper (C11000) within one hour. Within six hours, 99.999% of the adenovirus particles were inactivated. Within six hours, 50% of the infectious adenovirus particles survived on stainless steel.

=== Fungi ===
The antifungal efficacy of copper was compared to aluminium on the following organisms that can cause human infections: Aspergillus spp., Fusarium spp., Penicillium chrysogenum, Aspergillus niger and Candida albicans. An increased die-off of fungal spores was found on copper surfaces compared with aluminium. Aspergillus niger growth occurred on the aluminium coupons growth was inhibited on and around copper coupons.

== See also ==
- Antimicrobial copper-alloy touch surfaces
- Copper alloys in aquaculture
- Copper-silver ionization
- Medical uses of silver
- Oligodynamic effect
