= Dimethyloctadecyl(3-trimethoxysilylpropyl)ammonium chloride =

Names
- Preferred IUPAC name N,N-Dimethyl-N-[3-(triethoxysilyl)propyl]octadecan-1-aminium chloride

Identifiers
| CAS Number | 27668-52-6 |
| 3D model (JSmol) | Interactive image |
| ChEMBL | ChEMBL2360248 |
| ChemSpider | 56561 |
| ECHA InfoCard | 100.044.163 |
| EC Number | 248-595-8 |
| PubChem CID | 62827 |
| UNII | IQ36O85WQ4 |
| CompTox Dashboard (EPA) | DTXSID4035542 |
- InChI: InChI=1S/C26H58NO3Si.ClH/c1-7-8-9-10-11-12-13-14-15-16-17-18-19-20-21-22-24-27(2,3)25-23-26-31(28-4,29-5)30-6;/h7-26H2,1-6H3;1H/q+1;/p-1 Key: WSFMFXQNYPNYGG-UHFFFAOYSA-M
- SMILES: [Cl-].CCCCCCCCCCCCCCCCCC[N+](C)(C)CCC[Si](OC)(OC)OC

Properties
| Chemical formula | C_{26}H_{58}ClNO_{3}Si |
| Molar mass | 496.29 g·mol^{−1} |
- Except where otherwise noted, data are given for materials in their standard state (at 25 °C [77 °F], 100 kPa). Infobox references

Dimethyloctadecyl(3-trimethoxysilylpropyl)ammonium chloride (DTSACl) is a disinfectant used as a preservative and fungicide. Its chemical formula is C_{26}H_{58}NO_{3}SiCl. It is also used as a silane coupling agent.

== See also ==
- Dimethyldioctadecylammonium chloride
