= Antimicrobial copper-alloy touch surfaces =

Surfaces with antimicrobial copper coatings

Antimicrobial copper-alloy touch surfaces can prevent frequently touched surfaces from serving as reservoirs for the spread of pathogenic microbes. This is especially true in healthcare facilities, where harmful viruses, bacteria, and fungi colonize and persist on doorknobs, push plates, handrails, tray tables, tap (faucet) handles, IV poles, HVAC systems, and other equipment. These microbes can sometimes survive on surfaces for more than 30 days.

The surfaces of copper and its alloys, such as brass and bronze, are antimicrobial. They have an inherent ability to kill a wide range of harmful microbes relatively rapidly – often within two hours or less – and with a high degree of efficiency. These antimicrobial properties have been demonstrated by an extensive body of research. The research also suggests that if touch surfaces are made with copper alloys, the reduced transmission of disease-causing organisms can reduce patient infections in hospital intensive care units (ICU) by as much as 58%. Several companies have developed methods for utilizing the antimicrobial functionality of copper on existing high-touch surfaces. LuminOre and Aereus Technologies both utilize cold-spray antimicrobial copper coating technology to apply antimicrobial coatings to surfaces.

== Evidence ==
As of 2019 a number of studies have found that copper surfaces may help prevent infection in the healthcare environment.

Microorganisms are known to survive on inanimate surfaces for extended periods of time. Hand and surface disinfection practices are a primary measure against the spread of infection. Since approximately 80% of infectious diseases are known to be transmitted by touch, and pathogens found in healthcare facilities can survive on inanimate surfaces for days or months, the microbial burden of frequently touched surfaces is believed to play a significant role in infection causality.

== EPA registrations ==
On February 29, 2008, the United States Environmental Protection Agency (EPA) approved the registrations of five different groups of copper alloys as "antimicrobial materials" with public health benefits. The EPA registrations now cover 479 different compositions of copper alloys within six groups (an up-to-date list of all approved alloys is available). All of the alloys have minimum nominal copper concentrations of 60%. The results of the EPA-supervised antimicrobial studies demonstrating copper's strong antimicrobial efficacies across a wide range of alloys have been published.

=== Microbes tested and killed in EPA laboratory tests ===
The bacteria destroyed by copper alloys in the EPA-supervised antimicrobial efficiency tests include:

- Escherichia coli O157:H7, a foodborne pathogen associated with large-scale food recalls.
- Methicillin-resistant Staphylococcus aureus (MRSA), one of the most virulent strains of antibiotic-resistant bacteria and a common culprit of hospital- and community-acquired infections.
- Staphylococcus aureus, the most common of all bacterial staphylococcus (i.e., Staph) infections that cause life-threatening disease, including pneumonia and meningitis.
- Enterobacter aerogenes, a pathogenic bacterium commonly found in hospitals that causes opportunistic skin infections and impacts other body tissues.
- Pseudomonas aeruginosa, a bacterium in immunocompromised individuals that infects the pulmonary and urinary tracts, blood and skin.
- Vancomycin-resistant Enterococcus (VRE), a pathogenic bacterium that is the second leading cause of hospital-acquired infections.

=== EPA test protocols for copper alloy surfaces ===
The registrations are based on studies supervised by EPA which found that copper alloys kill more than 99.9% of disease-causing bacteria within just two hours when cleaned regularly (i.e., the metals are free of dirt or grime that may impede the bacteria's contact with the copper surface).

To attain the EPA registrations, the copper alloy groups had to demonstrate strong antimicrobial efficacies according to all of the following rigorous tests:

- efficiency as a sanitizer: This test protocol measures surviving bacteria on alloy surfaces after two hours.
- Residual self-sanitizing activity: This test protocol measures surviving bacteria on alloy surfaces before and after six wet and dry wear cycles over 24 hours in a standard wear apparatus.
- Continuous reduction of bacterial contamination: This test protocol measures the number of bacteria that survive on a surface after it has been re-inoculated eight times over a 24-hour period without intermediate cleaning or wiping.

=== EPA registered antimicrobial copper alloys ===
The alloy groups tested and approved were C11000, C51000, C70600, C26000, C75200, and C28000.

The EPA registration numbers for the six groups of alloys are as follows:

Group	Copper %	EPA registration number
I	95.2 to 99.99	82012-1
II	87.3 to 95.0	82012-2
III	78.1 to 87.09	82012-3
IV	68.2 to 77.5	82012-4
V	65.0 to 67.8	82012-5
VI	60.0 to 64.5	82012-6

=== Claims granted by EPA in antimicrobial copper alloy registrations ===
The following claims are now legally permitted when marketing EPA-registered antimicrobial copper alloys in the U.S.:

Laboratory testing has shown that when cleaned regularly:

- Antimicrobial Copper Alloys continuously reduce bacterial contamination, achieving 99.9% reduction within two hours of exposure.
- Antimicrobial Copper Alloy surfaces kill greater than 99.9% of Gram-negative and Gram-positive bacteria within two hours of exposure.
- Antimicrobial Copper Alloy surfaces deliver continuous and ongoing antibacterial action, remaining effective in killing greater than 99% of bacteria within two hours.
- Antimicrobial Copper Alloys surfaces kill greater than 99.9% of bacteria within two hours, and continue to kill 99% of bacteria even after repeated contamination.
- Antimicrobial Copper Alloys surfaces help inhibit the buildup and growth of bacteria within two hours of exposure between routine cleaning and sanitizing steps.
- Testing demonstrates effective antibacterial activity against Staphylococcus aureus, Enterobacter aerogenes, Methicillin-resistant Staphylococcus aureus (MRSA), Escherichia coli O157:H7, and Pseudomonas aeruginosa

The registrations state that "antimicrobial copper alloys may be used in hospitals, other healthcare facilities, and various public, commercial and residential buildings."

=== Product stewardship requirements of EPA ===
As a condition of registration established by EPA, the Copper Development Association (CDA) in the U.S. is responsible for the product stewardship of antimicrobial copper alloy products. CDA must ensure that manufacturers promote these products in an appropriate manner. Manufacturers must only promote the proper use and care of these products and must specifically emphasize that the use of these products is a supplement and not a substitute to routine hygienic practices.

EPA mandated that all advertising and marketing materials for antimicrobial copper products contain the following statement:

The use of a Copper Alloy surface is a supplement to and not a substitute for standard infection control practices; users must continue to follow all current infection control practices, including those practices related to cleaning and disinfection of environmental surfaces. The Copper Alloy surface material has been shown to reduce microbial contamination, but it does not necessarily prevent cross-contamination.

Antimicrobial copper alloys are intended to provide supplemental antimicrobial action in between routine cleaning of environmental or touch surfaces in healthcare settings, as well as in public buildings and the home. Users must also understand that in order for antimicrobial copper alloys to remain effective, they cannot be coated in any way.

CDA is currently implementing an outreach program through written communications, a product stewardship website, and through a Working Group which meets periodically to expand educational efforts.

More than 100 different potential product applications were cited in the registrations for their potential public health benefits.

==== EPA warranty statement ====
The EPA warranty statement is worded as follows:

If used as intended, ANTIMICROBIAL COPPER ALLOYS are wear-resistant and the durable antibacterial properties will remain effective for as long as the product remains in place and is used as directed.

Note: With the exception of the product name and the percentage of active ingredient, the EPA-approved Master Labels for the six groups of registered alloys are identical.

== Antimicrobial copper products ==
Many antimicrobial copper alloy products have been approved for registration in healthcare facilities, public and commercial buildings, residences, mass transit facilities, laboratories, and play area equipment in the US. A complete list of registered products is available from EPA.

== See also ==
- Antimicrobial properties of copper
- Copper alloys in aquaculture
