= Antimicrobial =

Drug used to kill microorganisms or stop their growth

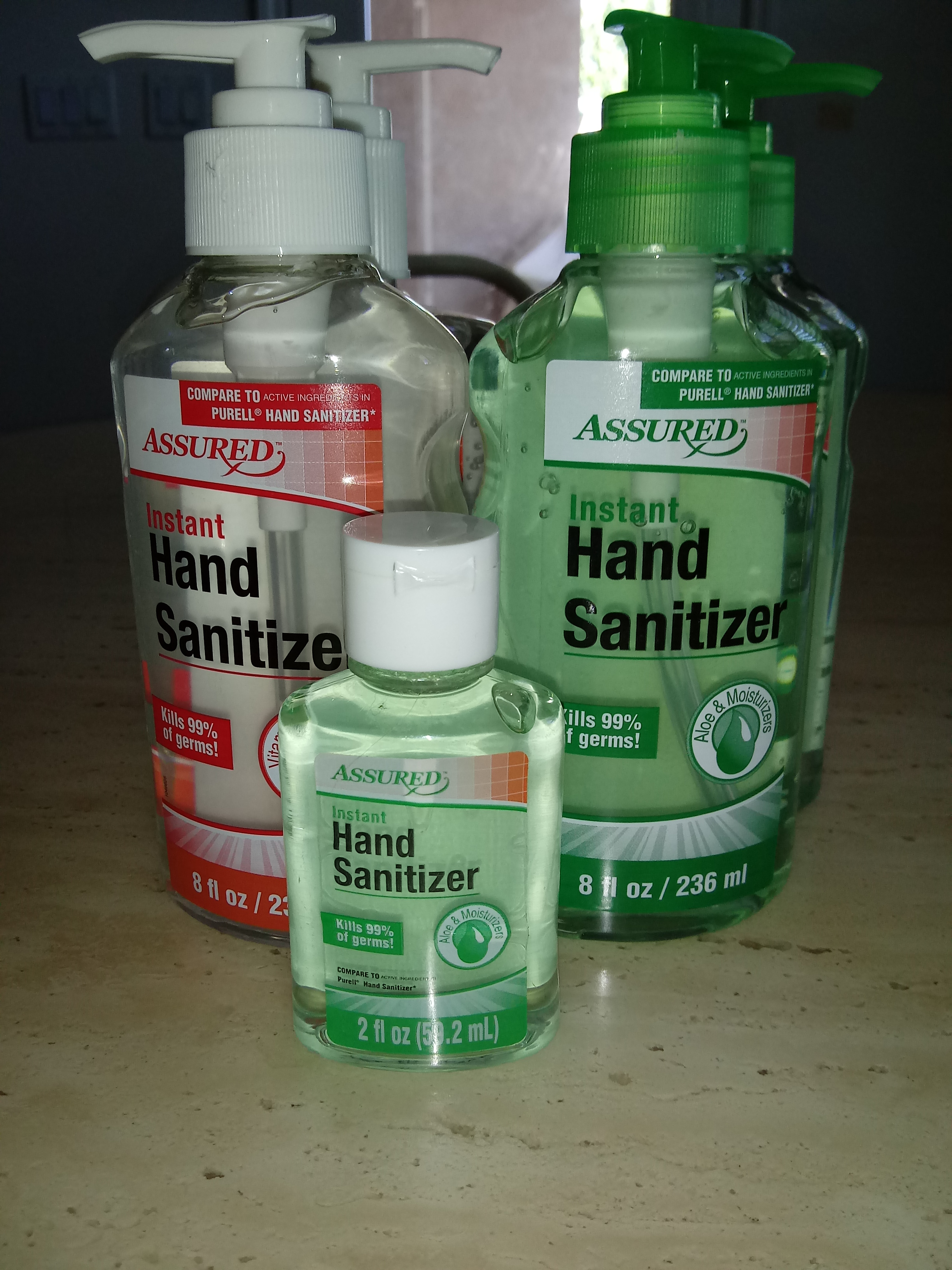
Hand sanitizer is a common consumer-level antimicrobial product

An antimicrobial is an agent that kills microorganisms (microbicide) or stops their growth (bacteriostatic agent). Antimicrobial medicines can be grouped according to the microorganisms they are used to treat. For example, antibiotics are used against bacteria, and antifungals are used against fungi. They can also be classified according to their function. Antimicrobial medicines to treat infection are known as antimicrobial chemotherapy, while antimicrobial drugs are used to prevent infection, which known as antimicrobial prophylaxis.

The main classes of antimicrobial agents are disinfectants (non-selective agents, such as bleach), which kill a wide range of microbes on surfaces to prevent the spread of illness, antiseptics which are applied to living tissue and help reduce infection during surgery, and antibiotics which destroy microorganisms within the body. The term antibiotic originally described only those formulations derived from living microorganisms but is now also applied to synthetic agents, such as sulfonamides or fluoroquinolones. Though the term used to be restricted to antibacterials, its context has broadened to include all antimicrobials. In response, further advancements in antimicrobial technologies have resulted in solutions that can go beyond simply inhibiting microbial growth. Instead, certain types of porous media have been developed to kill microbes on contact. The misuse and overuse of antimicrobials in humans, animals and plants are the main drivers in the development of drug-resistant pathogens. It is estimated that bacterial antimicrobial resistance (AMR) was directly responsible for 1.27 million global deaths in 2019 and contributed to 4.95 million deaths.

== History ==
Antimicrobial use has been common practice for at least 2000 years. Ancient Egyptians and ancient Greeks used specific molds and plant extracts to treat infection.

In the 19th century, microbiologists such as Louis Pasteur and Jules Francois Joubert observed antagonism between some bacteria and discussed the merits of controlling these interactions in medicine. Louis Pasteur's work in fermentation and spontaneous generation led to the distinction between anaerobic and aerobic bacteria. The information garnered by Pasteur led Joseph Lister to incorporate antiseptic methods, such as sterilizing surgical tools and debriding wounds into surgical procedures. The implementation of these antiseptic techniques drastically reduced the number of infections and subsequent deaths associated with surgical procedures. Louis Pasteur's work in microbiology also led to the development of many vaccines for life-threatening diseases such as anthrax and rabies. On September 3, 1928, Alexander Fleming returned from a vacation and discovered that a Petri dish filled with Staphylococcus was separated into colonies due to the antimicrobial fungus Penicillium rubens. Fleming and his associates struggled to isolate the antimicrobial but referenced its therapeutic potential in 1929 in the British Journal of Experimental Pathology. In 1942, Howard Florey, Ernst Chain, and Edward Abraham used Fleming's work to purify and extract penicillin for medicinal uses earning them the 1945 Nobel Prize in Medicine.

== Chemical ==
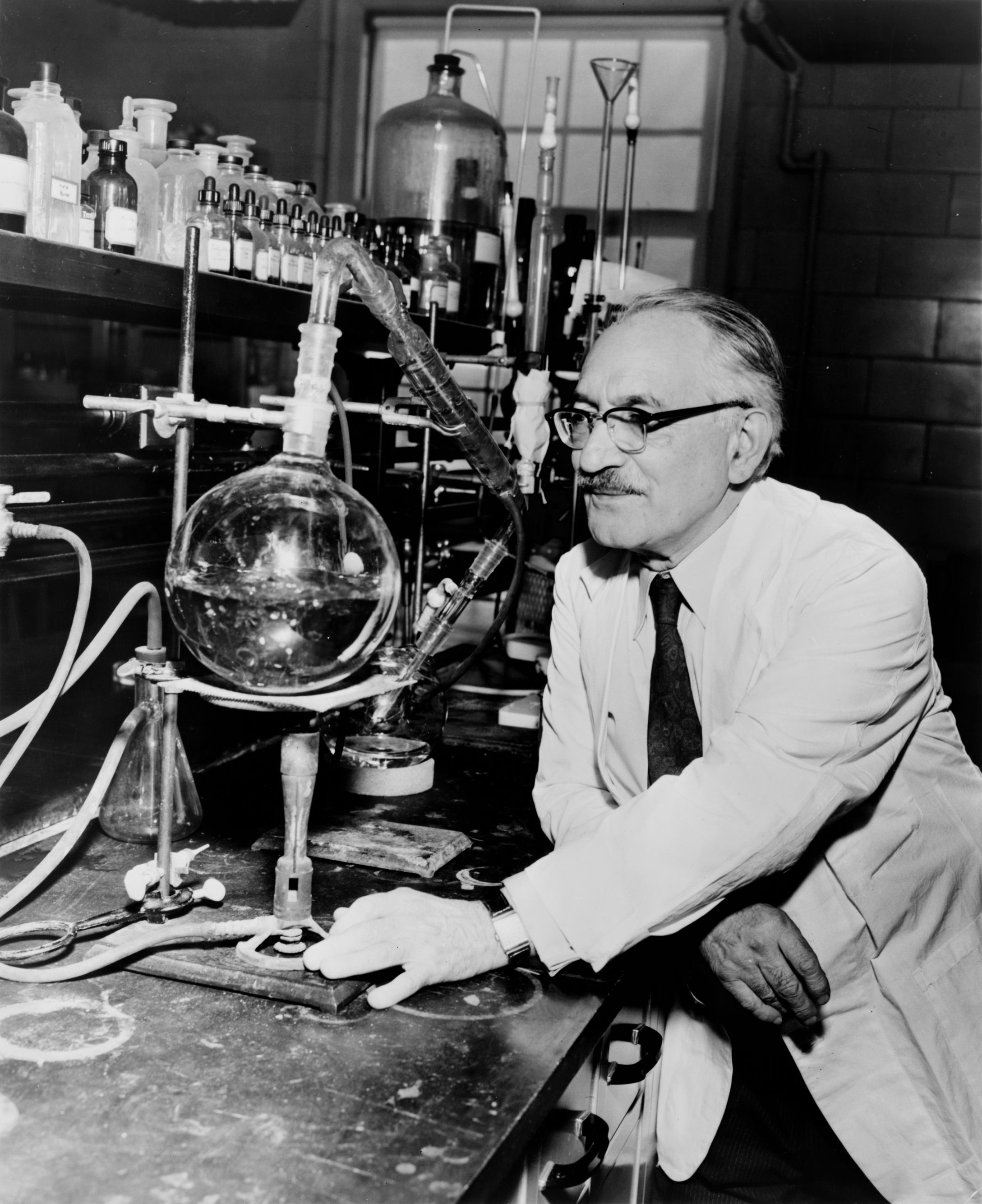
Selman Waksman, who was awarded the Nobel Prize in Medicine for developing 22 antibiotics—most notably Streptomycin

=== Antibacterials ===
Antibacterials are used to treat bacterial infections. Antibiotics are classified generally as beta-lactams, macrolides, quinolones, tetracyclines or aminoglycosides. Their classification within these categories depends on their antimicrobial spectra, pharmacodynamics and chemical composition. Prolonged use of certain antibacterials can decrease the number of enteric bacteria, which may have a negative impact on health. Consumption of probiotics and healthy eating may help to replace destroyed gut flora. Stool transplants may be considered however for patients who are having difficulty recovering from prolonged antibiotic treatment, such as recurrent Clostridioides difficile infections.

The discovery, development and use of antibacterials during the 20th century have reduced mortality from bacterial infections. The antibiotic era began with the therapeutic application of sulfonamide drugs in 1936, followed by a "golden" period of discovery from about 1945 to 1970, when a number of structurally diverse and highly effective agents were discovered and developed. Since 1980, the introduction of new antimicrobial agents for clinical use has declined, in part because of the enormous expense of developing and testing new drugs. In parallel, there has been an alarming increase in antimicrobial resistance of bacteria, fungi, parasites and some viruses to multiple existing agents.

Antibacterials are among the most commonly used and misused drugs by physicians, for example, in viral respiratory tract infections. As a consequence of widespread and injudicious use of antibacterials, there has been an accelerated emergence of antibiotic-resistant pathogens, resulting in a serious threat to global public health. The resistance problem demands that a renewed effort be made to seek antibacterial agents effective against pathogenic bacteria resistant to current antibacterials. Possible strategies towards this objective include increased sampling from diverse environments and application of metagenomics to identify bioactive compounds produced by currently unknown and uncultured microorganisms as well as the development of small-molecule libraries customized for bacterial targets.

=== Antifungals ===
Antifungals are used to kill or prevent further growth of fungi. In medicine, they are used as a treatment for infections such as athlete's foot, ringworm and thrush and work by exploiting differences between mammalian and fungal cells. Unlike bacteria, both fungi and humans are eukaryotes. Thus, fungal and human cells are similar at the molecular level, making it more difficult to find a target for an antifungal drug to attack that does not also exist in the host organism. Consequently, there are often side effects to some of these drugs. Some of these side effects can be life-threatening if the drug is not used properly.

As well as their use in medicine, antifungals are frequently sought after to control indoor mold in damp or wet home materials. Sodium bicarbonate (baking soda) blasted on to surfaces acts as an antifungal. Another antifungal solution applied after or without blasting by soda is a mix of hydrogen peroxide and a thin surface coating that neutralizes mold and encapsulates the surface to prevent spore release. Some paints are also manufactured with an added antifungal agent for use in high humidity areas such as bathrooms or kitchens. Other antifungal surface treatments typically contain variants of metals known to suppress mold growth e.g. pigments or solutions containing copper, silver or zinc. These solutions are not usually available to the general public because of their toxicity.

=== Antivirals ===
Antiviral drugs are a class of medication used specifically for treating viral infections. Like antibiotics, specific antivirals are used for specific viruses. They should be distinguished from viricides, which actively deactivate virus particles outside the body.

Many antiviral drugs are designed to treat infections by retroviruses, including HIV. Important antiretroviral drugs include the class of protease inhibitors. Herpes viruses, best known for causing cold sores and genital herpes, are usually treated with the nucleoside analogue acyclovir. Viral hepatitis is caused by five unrelated hepatotropic viruses (A-E) and may be treated with antiviral drugs depending on the type of infection. Some influenza A and B viruses have become resistant to neuraminidase inhibitors such as oseltamivir, and the search for new substances continues.

=== Antiparasitics ===
Antiparasitics are a class of medications indicated for the treatment of infectious diseases such as leishmaniasis, malaria and Chagas disease, which are caused by parasites such as nematodes, cestodes, trematodes and infectious protozoa. Antiparasitic medications include metronidazole, iodoquinol and albendazole. Like all therapeutic antimicrobials, they must kill the infecting organism without serious damage to the host.

=== Broad-spectrum therapeutics ===
Broad-spectrum therapeutics are active against multiple classes of pathogens. Such therapeutics have been suggested as potential emergency treatments for pandemics.

=== Non-pharmaceutical ===
A wide range of chemical and natural compounds are used as antimicrobials. Organic acids and their salts are used widely in food products, e.g. lactic acid, citric acid, acetic acid, either as ingredients or as disinfectants. For example, beef carcasses often are sprayed with acids, and then rinsed or steamed, to reduce the prevalence of Escherichia coli.

Heavy metal cations such as Hg^{2+} and Pb^{2+} have antimicrobial activities, but can be toxic. In recent years, the antimicrobial activity of coordination compounds has been investigated.

Traditional herbalists used plants to treat infectious disease. Many of these plants have been investigated scientifically for antimicrobial activity, and some plant products have been shown to inhibit the growth of pathogenic microorganisms. A number of these agents appear to have structures and modes of action that are distinct from those of the antibiotics in current use, suggesting that cross-resistance with agents already in use may be minimal.

==== Copper ====
Copper-alloy surfaces have natural intrinsic antimicrobial properties and can kill microorganisms such as E. coli and Staphylococcus. The United States Environmental Protection Agency approved the registration of antimicrobial copper alloy surfaces for use in addition to regular cleaning and disinfection to control infections. Antimicrobial copper alloys are being installed in some healthcare facilities and subway transit systems as a public hygienic measure. Copper nanoparticles are attracting interest for the intrinsic antimicrobial behaviours.

==== Essential oils ====
Many essential oils included in herbal pharmacopoeias are claimed to possess antimicrobial activity in vitro, with the oils of bay, cinnamon, clove and thyme reported to be the most potent in studies with foodborne bacterial pathogens.

While 25 to 50% of pharmaceutical compounds are plant-derived, none are used as antimicrobials, though there has been increased research in this direction. Barriers to increased usage in mainstream medicine include poor regulatory oversight and quality control, evidence only from in vitro studies, mislabeled or misidentified products, and limited modes of delivery.

==== Antimicrobial pesticides ====
According to the U.S. Environmental Protection Agency (EPA), and defined by the Federal Insecticide, Fungicide, and Rodenticide Act, antimicrobial pesticides are used to control growth of microbes through disinfection, sanitation, or reduction of development and to protect inanimate objects, industrial processes or systems, surfaces, water, or other chemical substances from contamination, fouling, or deterioration caused by bacteria, viruses, fungi, protozoa, algae, or slime. The EPA monitors products, such as disinfectants/sanitizers for use in hospitals or homes, to ascertain efficacy. Products that are meant for public health are therefore under this monitoring system, including products used for drinking water, swimming pools, food sanitation, and other environmental surfaces. These pesticide products are registered under the premise that, when used properly, they do not demonstrate unreasonable side effects to humans or the environment. Even once certain products are on the market, the EPA continues to monitor and evaluate them to make sure they maintain efficacy in protecting public health.

Public health products regulated by the EPA are divided into three categories:

- Disinfectants: Destroy or inactivate microorganisms (bacteria, fungi, viruses,) but may not act as sporicides (as those are the most difficult form to destroy). According to efficacy data, the EPA will classify a disinfectant as limited, general/ broad spectrum, or as a hospital disinfectant.
- Sanitizers: Reduce the number of microorganisms, but may not kill or eliminate all of them.
- Sterilizers (Sporicides): Eliminate all bacteria, fungi, spores, and viruses.

===== Antimicrobial pesticide safety =====
Antimicrobial pesticides have the potential to be a major factor in drug resistance. Organizations such as the World Health Organization call for significant reduction in their use globally to combat this. According to a 2010 Centers for Disease Control and Prevention report, health-care workers can take steps to improve their safety measures against antimicrobial pesticide exposure. Workers are advised to minimize exposure to these agents by wearing personal protective equipment such as gloves and safety glasses. Additionally, it is important to follow the handling instructions properly, as that is how the EPA has deemed them as safe to use. Employees should be educated about the health hazards and encouraged to seek medical care if exposure occurs.

=== Ozone ===
Ozone can kill microorganisms in air, water and process equipment and has been used in settings such as kitchen exhaust ventilation, garbage rooms, grease traps, biogas plants, wastewater treatment plants, textile production, breweries, dairies, food and hygiene production, pharmaceutical industries, bottling plants, zoos, municipal drinking-water systems, swimming pools and spas, and in the laundering of clothes and treatment of in–house mold and odors.

=== Antimicrobial scrubs ===
Antimicrobial scrubs can reduce the accumulation of odors and stains on scrubs, which in turn improves their longevity. These scrubs also come in a variety of colors and styles. As antimicrobial technology develops at a rapid pace, these scrubs are readily available, with more advanced versions hitting the market every year. These bacteria could then be spread to office desks, break rooms, computers, and other shared technology. This can lead to outbreaks and infections like methicillin-resistant staphylococcus aureus, treatments for which cost the healthcare industry $20 billion a year.

=== Halogens ===
Elements such as chlorine, iodine, fluorine, and bromine are nonmetallic in nature and constitute the halogen family. Each of these halogens have a different antimicrobial effect that is influenced by various factors such as pH, temperature, contact time, and type of microorganism. Chlorine and iodine are the two most commonly used antimicrobials. Chlorine is extensively used as a disinfectant in the water treatment plants, drug, and food industries. In wastewater treatment plants, chlorine is widely used as a disinfectant. It oxidizes soluble contaminants and kills bacteria and viruses. It is also highly effective against bacterial spores. The mode of action is by breaking the bonds present in these microorganisms. When a bacterial enzyme comes in contact with a compound containing chlorine, the hydrogen atom in that molecule gets displaced and is replaced with chlorine. This in turn changes the enzyme function which ultimately leads to the death of the bacterium. Iodine is most commonly used for sterilization and wound cleaning. The three major antimicrobial compounds containing iodine are alcohol-iodine solution, an aqueous solution of iodine, and iodophors. Iodophors are more bactericidal and are used as antiseptics as they are less irritating when applied to the skin. Bacterial spores on the other hand cannot be killed by iodine, but they can be inhibited by iodophors. The growth of microorganisms is inhibited when iodine penetrates into the cells and oxidizes proteins, genetic material, and fatty acids. Bromine is also an effective antimicrobial that is used in water treatment plants. When mixed with chlorine it is highly effective against bacterial spores such as S. faecalis.

=== Alcohols ===
Alcohols are commonly used as disinfectants and antiseptics. Alcohols kill vegetative bacteria, most viruses and fungi. Ethyl alcohol, n-propanol and isopropyl alcohol are the most commonly used antimicrobial agents. Methanol is also a disinfecting agent but is not generally used as it is highly poisonous. Escherichia coli, Salmonella, and Staphylococcus aureus are a few bacteria whose growth can be inhibited by alcohols. Alcohols have a high efficiency against enveloped viruses (60–70% ethyl alcohol) 70% isopropyl alcohol or ethanol are highly effective as an antimicrobial agent. In the presence of water, 70% alcohol causes coagulation of the proteins thus inhibiting microbial growth. Alcohols are not quite efficient when it comes to spores. The mode of action is by denaturing the proteins. Alcohols interfere with the hydrogen bonds present in the protein structure. Alcohols also dissolve the lipid membranes that are present in microorganisms. Disruption of the cell membrane is another property of alcohols that aids in cell death. Alcohols are cheap and effective antimicrobials. They are widely used in the pharmaceutical industry. Alcohols are commonly used in hand sanitizers, antiseptics, and disinfectants.

=== Phenol ===
Phenol, also known as carbolic acid, was one of the first chemicals was used as an antimicrobial agent. It has high antiseptic properties. It is bacteriostatic at concentrations of 0.1%–1% and is bactericidal and fungicidal at 1%–2%. A 5% solution kills anthrax spores in 48 hr.

Phenols are most commonly used in oral mouth washes and household cleaning agents. They are active against a wide range of bacteria, fungi and viruses. Phenol derivatives, such as thymol and cresol, are used because they are less toxic compared to phenol. These phenolic compounds have a benzene ring along with the –OH group incorporated into their structures. They have a higher antimicrobial activity. These compounds inhibit microbial growth by precipitating proteins which lead to their denaturation and by penetrating into the cell membrane of microorganisms and disrupting it. Hexachlorophene (bisphenol) is used as a surfactant. It is widely used in soaps, handwashes, and skin products because of its antiseptic properties. It is also used as a sterilizing agent. Cresol is an effective antimicrobial and is widely used in mouthwashes and cough drops.

=== Aldehydes ===
Aldehydes are highly effective against bacteria, fungi, and viruses. Aldehydes inhibit bacterial growth by disrupting the outer membrane. They are used in the disinfection and sterilization of surgical instruments. As they are highly toxic, they are not used in antiseptics. Currently, only three aldehyde compounds are of widespread practical use as disinfectant biocides, namely glutaraldehyde, formaldehyde, and ortho-phthalaldehyde (OPA) despite the demonstration that many other aldehydes possess good antimicrobial activity. However, due to its long contact time other disinfectants are commonly preferred.

== Physical ==
=== Heat ===
Microorganisms have a minimum temperature, an optimum, and a maximum temperature for growth. High temperature as well as low temperatures are used as physical agents of control. Different organisms show different degrees of resistance or susceptibility to heat or temperature, some organisms such as bacterial endospore are more resistant while vegetative cells are less resistant and are easily killed at lower temperatures. Another method that involves the use of heat to kill microorganisms is fractional sterilization. This process involves the exposure to a temperature of 100 degrees Celsius for an hour per day for several days. Fractional sterilization is also called tyndallization. Bacterial endospores can be killed using this method. Both dry and moist heat are effective in eliminating microbial life. For example, jars used to store preserves such as jam can be sterilized by heating them in a conventional oven. Heat is also used in pasteurization, a method for slowing the spoilage of foods such as milk, cheese, juices, wines and vinegar. Such products are heated to a certain temperature for a set period of time, which greatly reduces the number of harmful microorganisms. Low temperature is also used to inhibit microbial activity by slowing down microbial metabolism.

=== Radiation ===
Foods are often irradiated to kill harmful pathogens. There are two types of radiations that are used to inhibit the growth of microorganisms – ionizing and non-ionizing radiations. Common sources of radiation used in food sterilization include cobalt-60 (a gamma emitter), electron beams and X-rays. Ultraviolet light is also used to disinfect drinking water, both in small-scale personal-use systems and larger-scale community water purification systems.

=== Desiccation ===
Desiccation is also known as dehydration. It is the state of extreme dryness or the process of extreme drying. Some microorganisms like bacteria, yeasts and molds require water for their growth. Desiccation dries up the water content thus inhibiting microbial growth. On the availability of water, the bacteria resume their growth, thus desiccation does not completely inhibit bacterial growth. The instrument used to carry out this process is called a desiccator. This process is widely used in the food industry and is an efficient method for food preservation. Desiccation is also largely used in the pharmaceutical industry to store vaccines and other products.

=== Antimicrobial surfaces ===
Antimicrobial surfaces are designed to either inhibit the ability of microorganisms to grow or damaging them by chemical (copper toxicity) or physical processes (micro/nano-pillars to rupture cell walls). These surfaces are especially important for the healthcare industry. Designing effective antimicrobial surfaces demands an in-depth understanding of the initial microbe-surface adhesion mechanisms. Molecular dynamics simulation and time-lapse imaging are typically used to investigate these mechanisms.

=== Osmotic pressure ===
Osmotic pressure is the pressure required to prevent a solvent from passing from a region of high concentration to a region of low concentration through a semipermeable membrane. When the concentration of dissolved materials or solute is higher inside the cell than it is outside, the cell is said to be in a hypotonic environment and water will flow into the cell.When the bacteria is placed in hypertonic solution, it causes plasmolysis or cell shrinking, similarly in hypotonic solution, bacteria undergoes plasmotysis or turgid state. This plasmolysis and plasmotysis kills bacteria because it causes change in osmotic pressure.

== Antimicrobial resistance ==
The misuse and overuse of antimicrobials in humans, animals and plants are the main drivers in the development of drug-resistant pathogens. Antimicrobial resistance (AR) occurs when microbes develop the ability to resist the drugs designed to kill them. AR has the potential to affect people at any stage of life, as well as the healthcare, veterinary and agriculture industries. This makes it one of the world's most urgent public health problems. Antimicrobial resistance mechanisms fall into four main categories: (1) limiting uptake of a drug; (2) modifying a drug target; (3) inactivating a drug; and (4) active drug efflux. It is estimated that bacterial antimicrobial resistance (AMR) was directly responsible for 1.27 million global deaths in 2019 and contributed to 4.95 million deaths.

== See also ==
- Biocide
- Antiviral drug
- Antimicrobial textile finishes
- Vapour-phase-mediated antimicrobial activity
