= Stepped gable =

Type of gable design

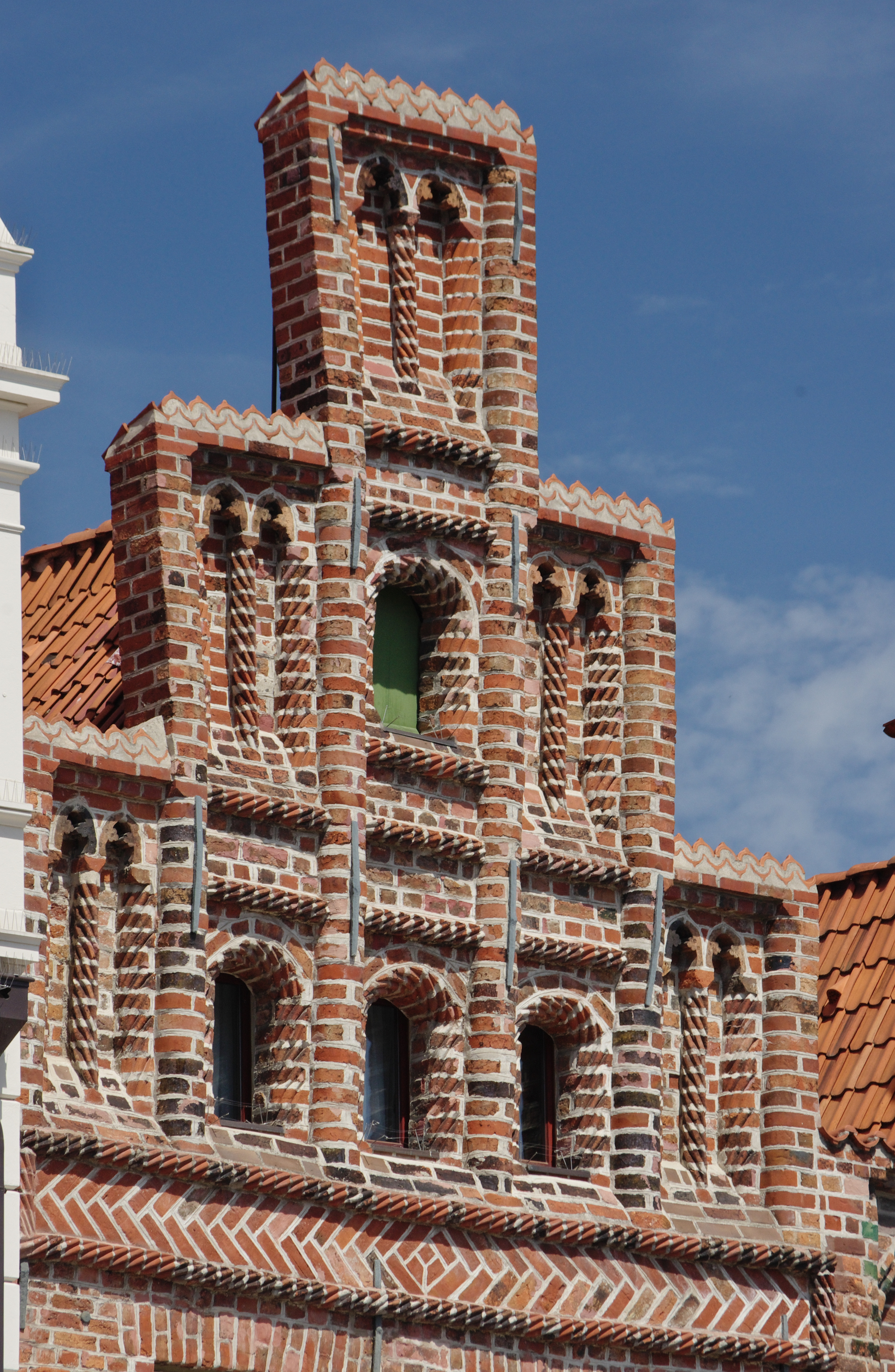
Crow-stepped gable on a house in Lüneburg, Germany

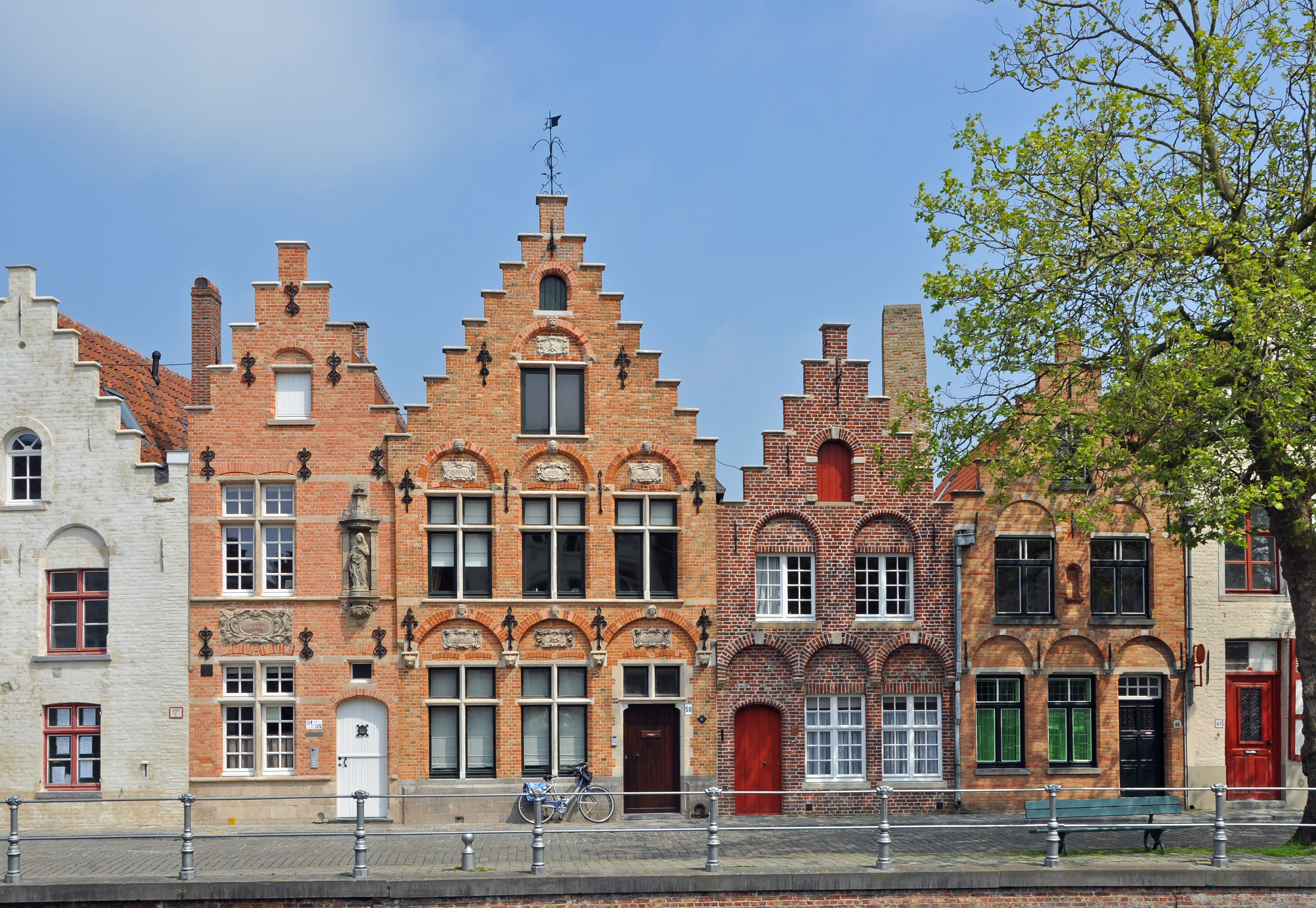
Buildings in Bruges, Belgium, with crow-stepped gables

A stepped gable, crow-stepped gable, or corbie step is a stairstep type of design at the top of the triangular gable-end of a building. The top of the parapet wall projects above the roofline and the top of the brick or stone wall is stacked in a step pattern above the roof as a decoration and as a convenient way to finish the brick courses. A stepped parapet may appear on building facades with or without gable ends, and even upon a false front.

== Geography ==
The oldest examples can be seen in Ghent (Flanders, Belgium) and date from the 12th century, such as the Spijker house on the Graslei, and some other Romanesque buildings in the city. From there, they spread to the whole of Northern Europe from the 13th century, in particular in cities of the Hanseatic League (with brick Gothic style), and then to Central Europe by the next century. These gables are numerous in Belgium, France (French Flanders, Eastern Normandy, Picardy and Alsace), the Netherlands, all Germany, Denmark, Sweden, Poland, and the Baltic States. They are also present but much rarer in the British Isles although the Old Elizabethan Library at Trinity Hall, Cambridge, dates to 1590. Crow-stepped gables are especially common on traditional Flemish and Dutch houses and on mediaeval Danish churches.

Crow-stepped gables were also used in Scotland as early as the 16th century. Examples of Scottish crow-stepped gables can be seen at Muchalls Castle, Monboddo House, and the Stonehaven Tolbooth, all late 16th and early 17th century buildings.

Nineteenth-century examples are found in North America, and the step gable is also a feature of the northern-Renaissance Revival and Dutch Colonial Revival styles.

== Architecture ==
In some regions of France, it's a utilitarian element in the architecture of thatched rural houses, where flat stones cover the load-bearing walls. In other regions, such as northern France (notably in the Soissonnais region), or Scotland, it is a purely decorative element in ashlar. Another version of the stepped gable with a purely decorative role is found in so-called noble or urban architecture, mainly in northern and central Europe, such as Germany, Flanders and the Netherlands.

=== Rural architecture ===
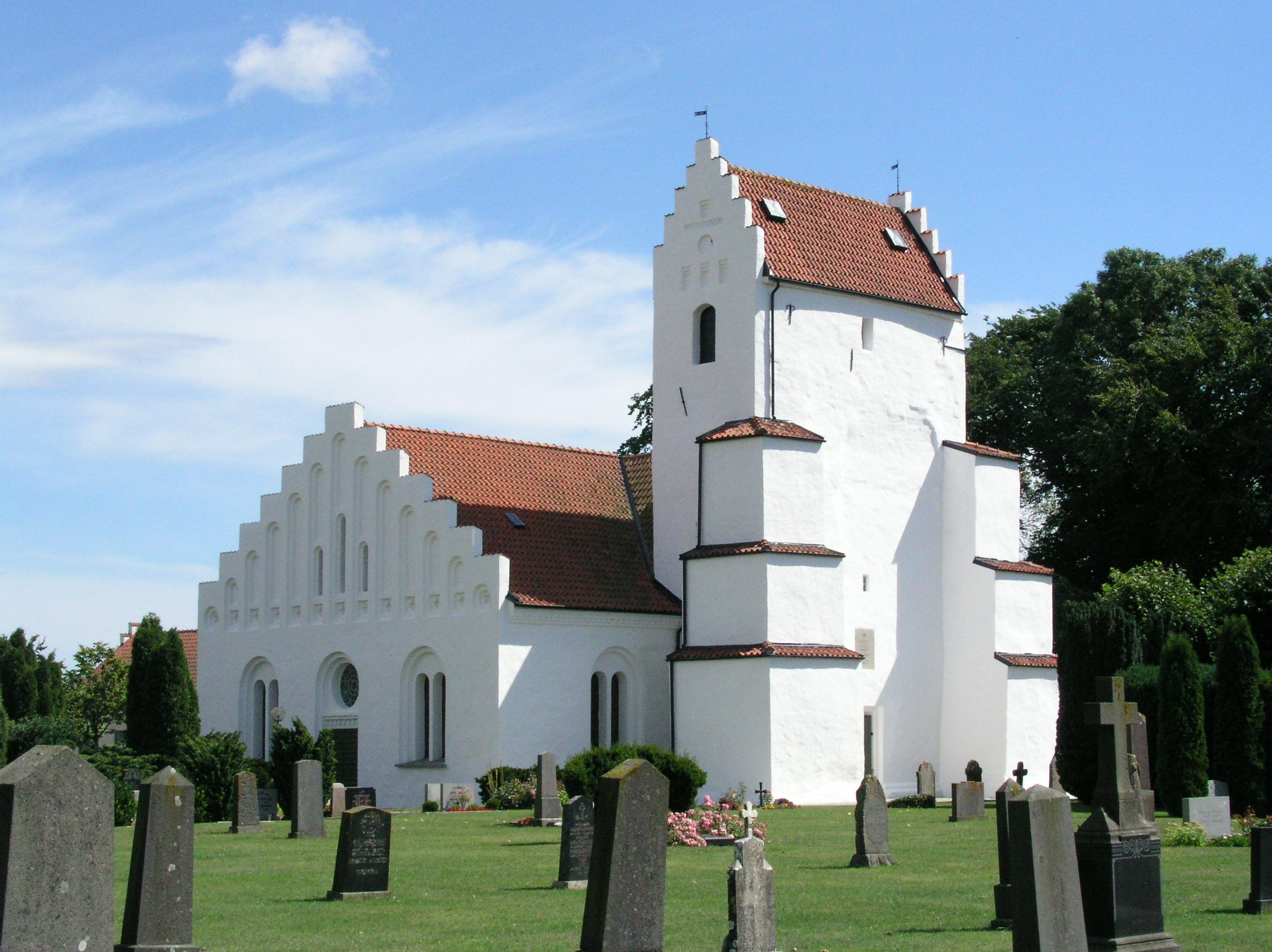
Stepped gables adorning the rural Östra Hoby Church, Sweden

In the rural architecture of various regions of France, the crenellated gables still visible on dwellings and barns are generally linked to the former existence of thatch roofing on these buildings, replaced during the 19th century by slate or flat tile roofing.

==== Usefulness ====
The main advantages of the vertical projection of the gable slopes were to prevent the thatched roof from being “unplucked” in high winds, to facilitate access to the roof ridge and to act as a firebreak.

In rural architecture, redents are generally covered with flat stones to protect them from the rain, prevent water infiltration into the load-bearing wall, and enable the roofer or road worker to place his tools. These stones often (but not always) slope downwards to allow rainwater to drain away.

In the Campan valley (Hautes-Pyrénées), thatched roofs with overhanging gables can be found on temporary barns transformed into permanent farmhouses in the 19th century by family cadets, either by adding a single room (caouhadé or chauffoir) against a gable, or by creating a living space in the barn itself.

==== Rhône-Alpes ====
In the Rhône-Alpes region, they are typical of the architecture of eastern Nord-Isère (Morestel and Crémieu cantons) and neighboring southern Bugey (villages of Izieu, Prémeyzel, Lhuis, Brégnier-Cordon, Arbignieu, etc.). They are also widespread in the traditional habitat of the northern Vercors (Quatre Montagnes).

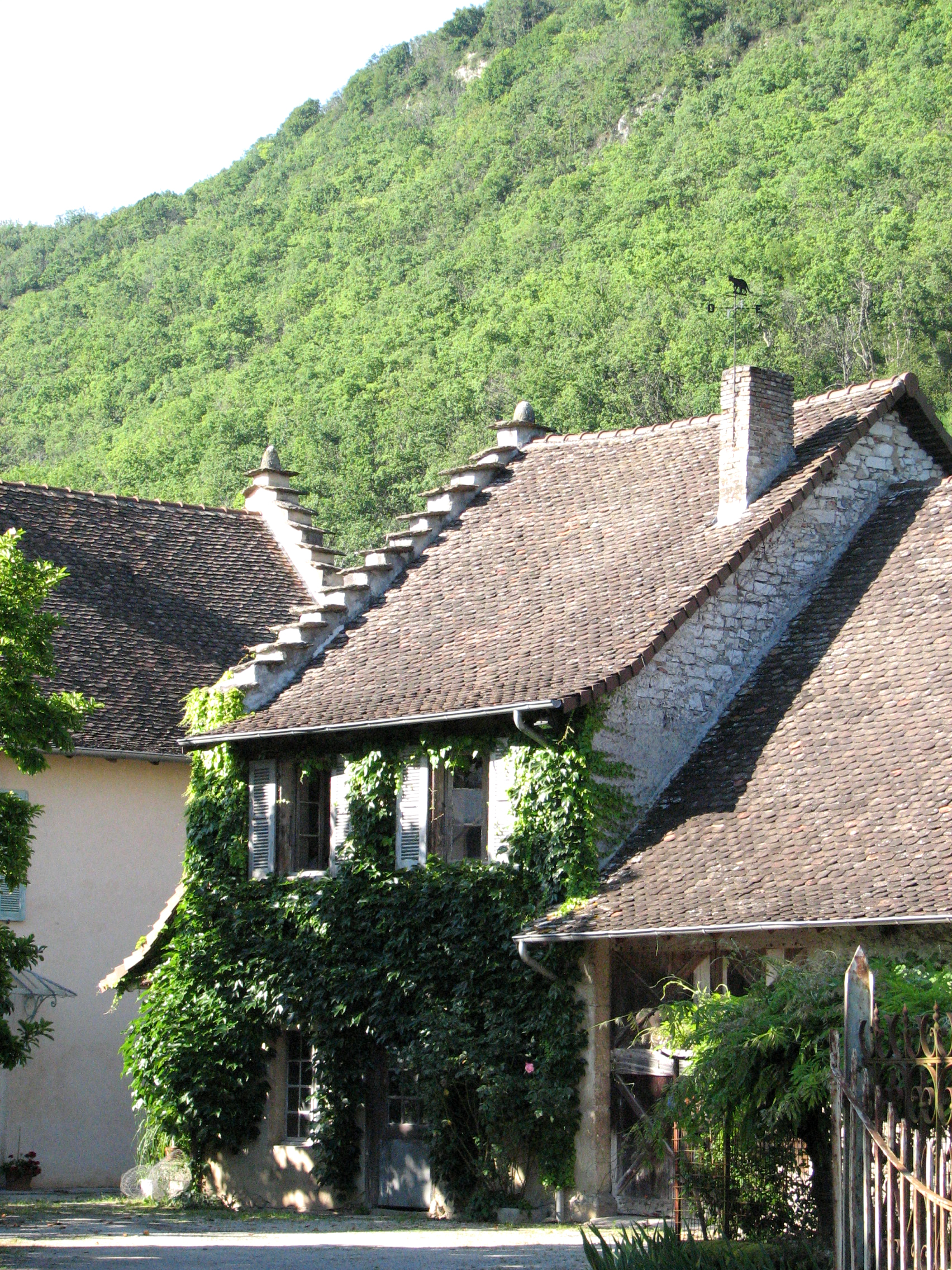
Brégnier-Cordon (Ain).

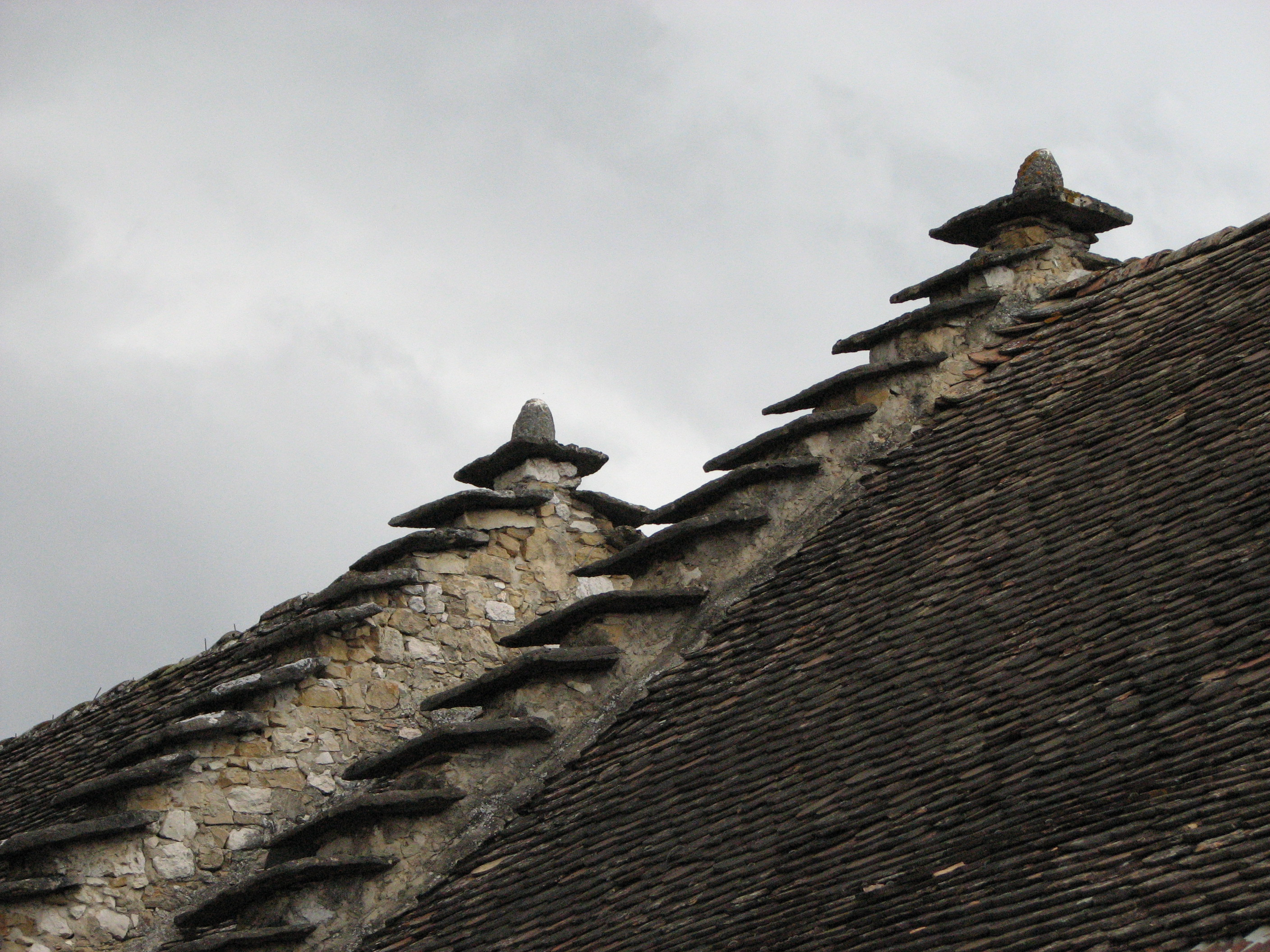
Izieu (Ain).

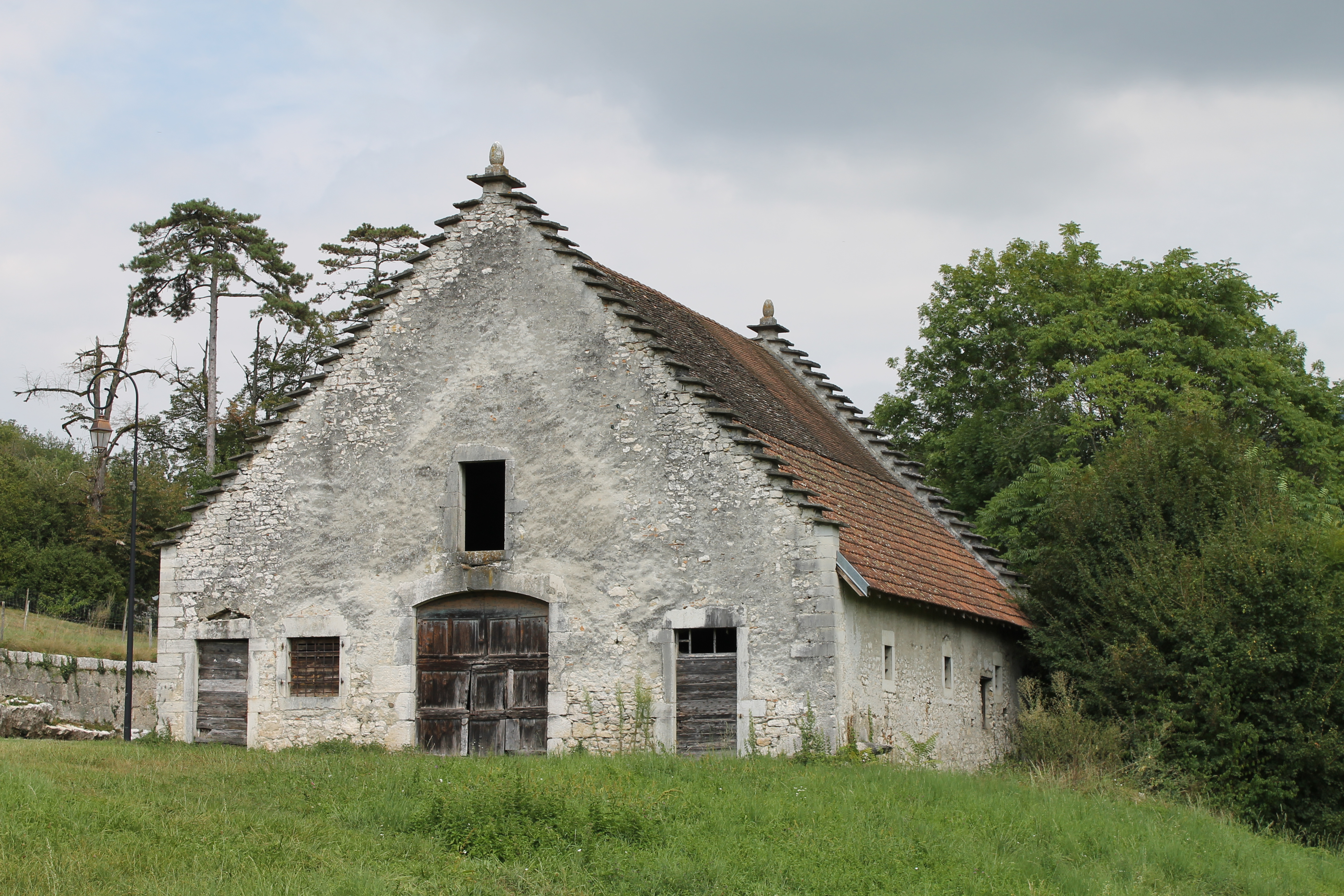
Murs-et-Gélignieux (Ain).

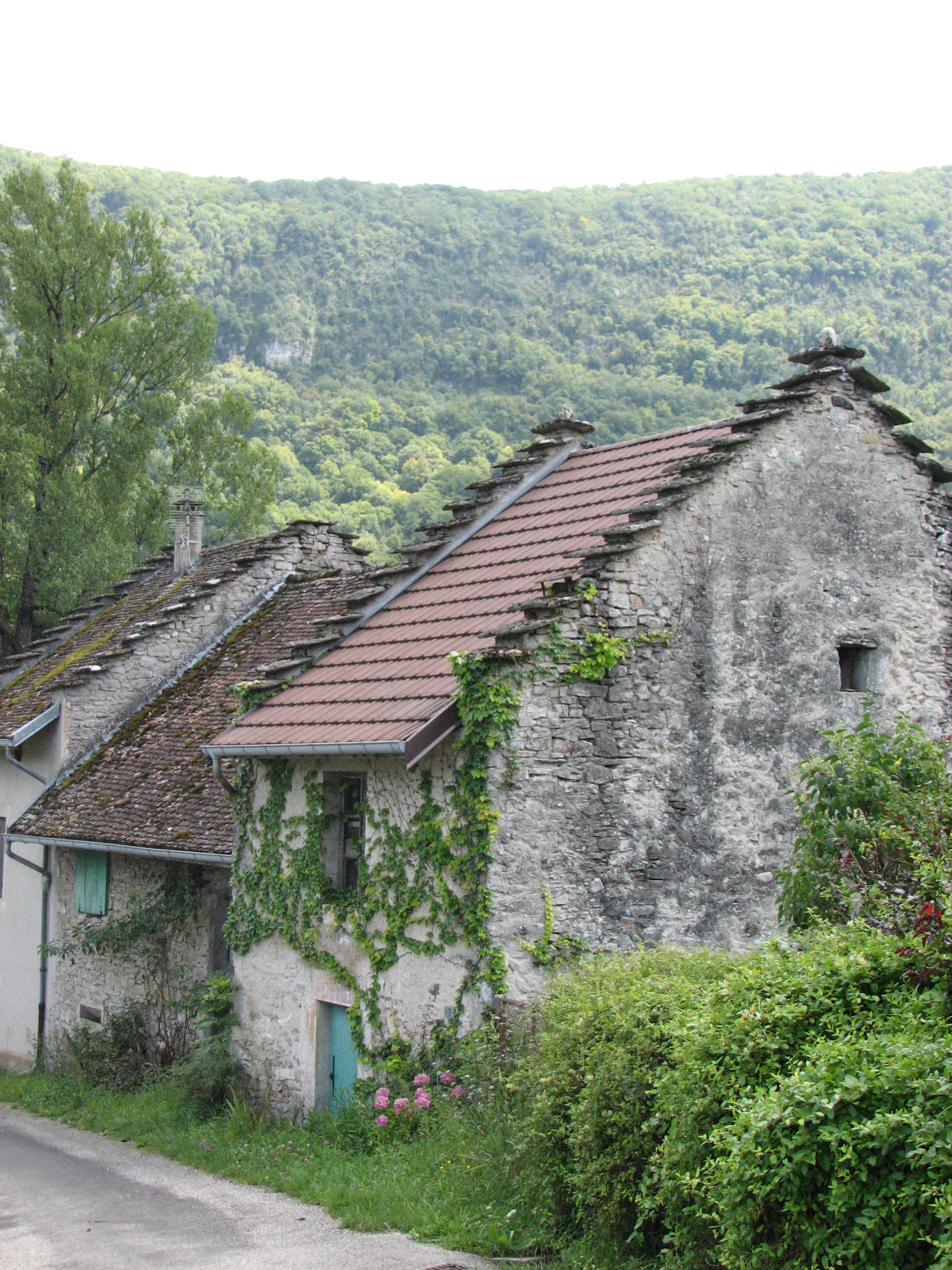
Prémeyzel (Ain).

In Frangy, Haute-Savoie, not far from the Bugey region, a rare example of this type of gabled roof can be found at the Bel-Air farm, which is listed as a historic monument.

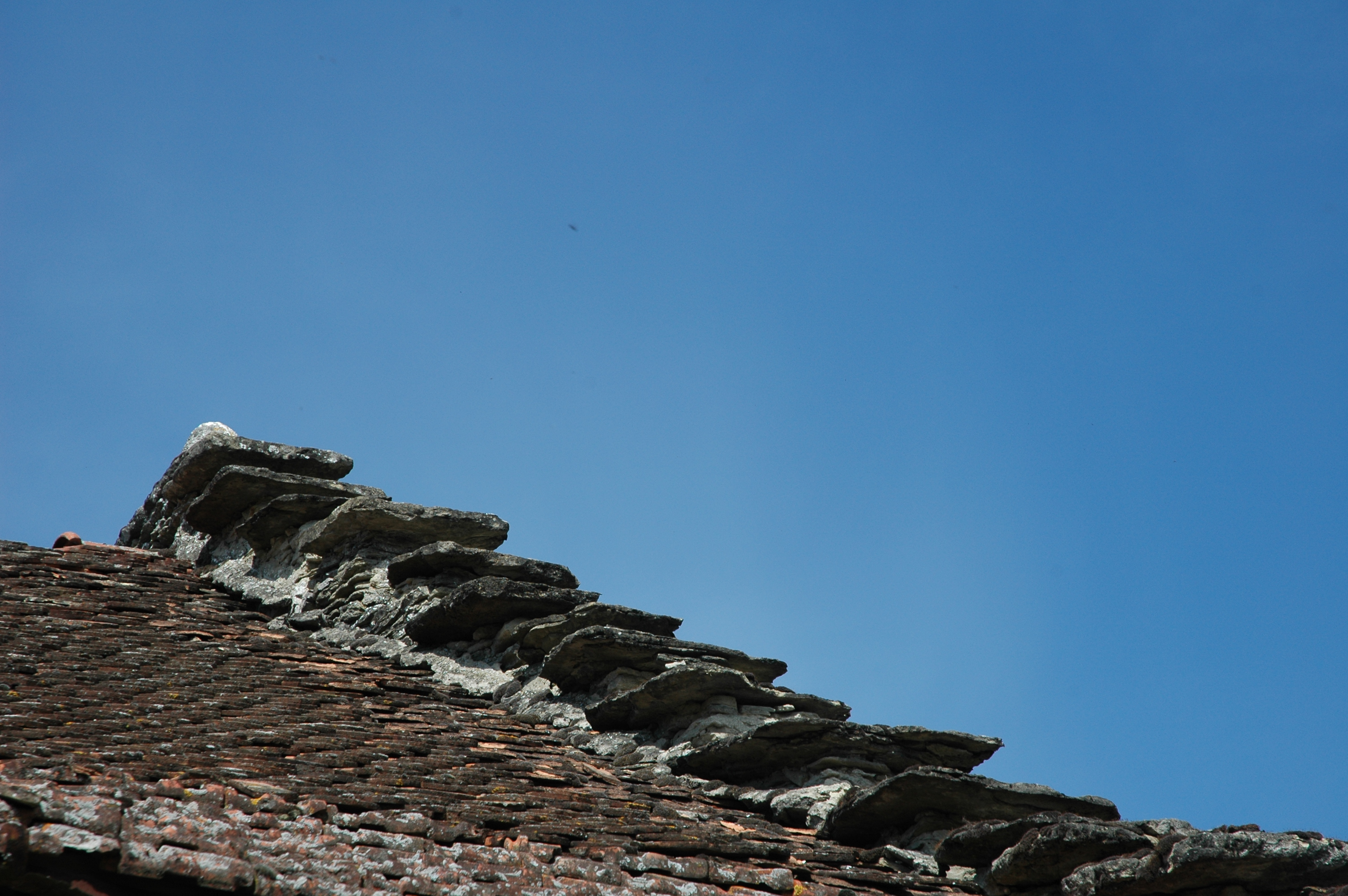
Farmhouse of Bel-Air in Frangy (Haute-Savoie).

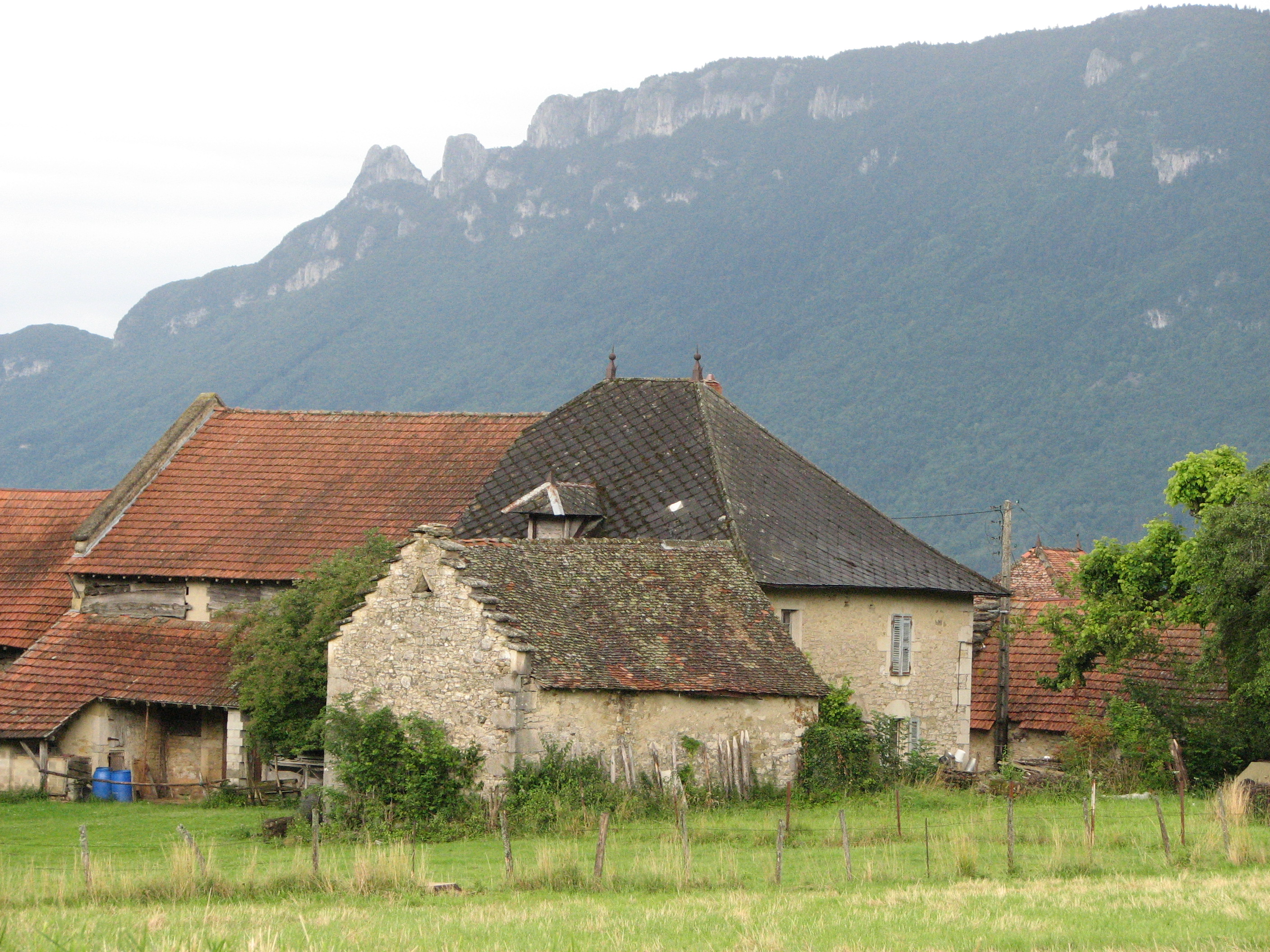
Hamlet in the Loisieux commune (Savoie), with Mont du Chat in the background.

==== Central Pyrenees ====
In the central Pyrenees, from Bigorre to Couserans, gabled roofs are a common feature of barn and sheepfold architecture.

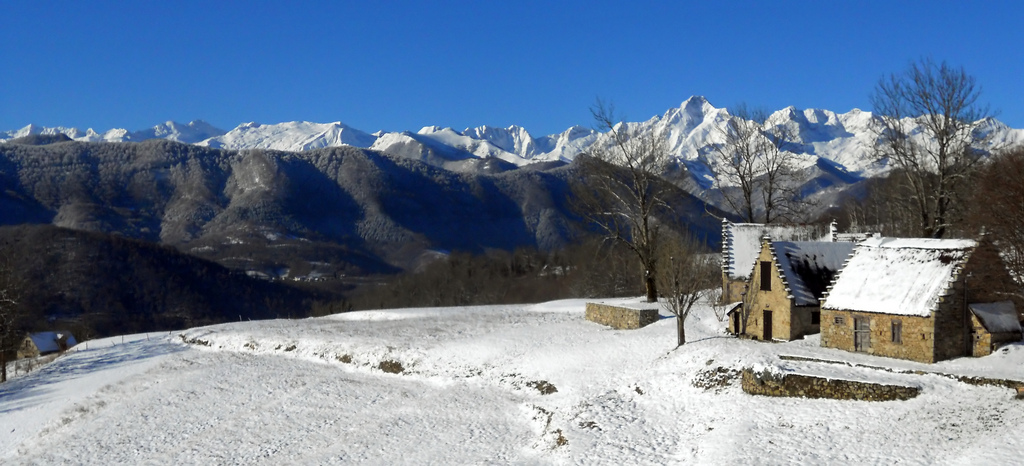
Les granges de Cominac, in the commune of Ercé (Ariège).

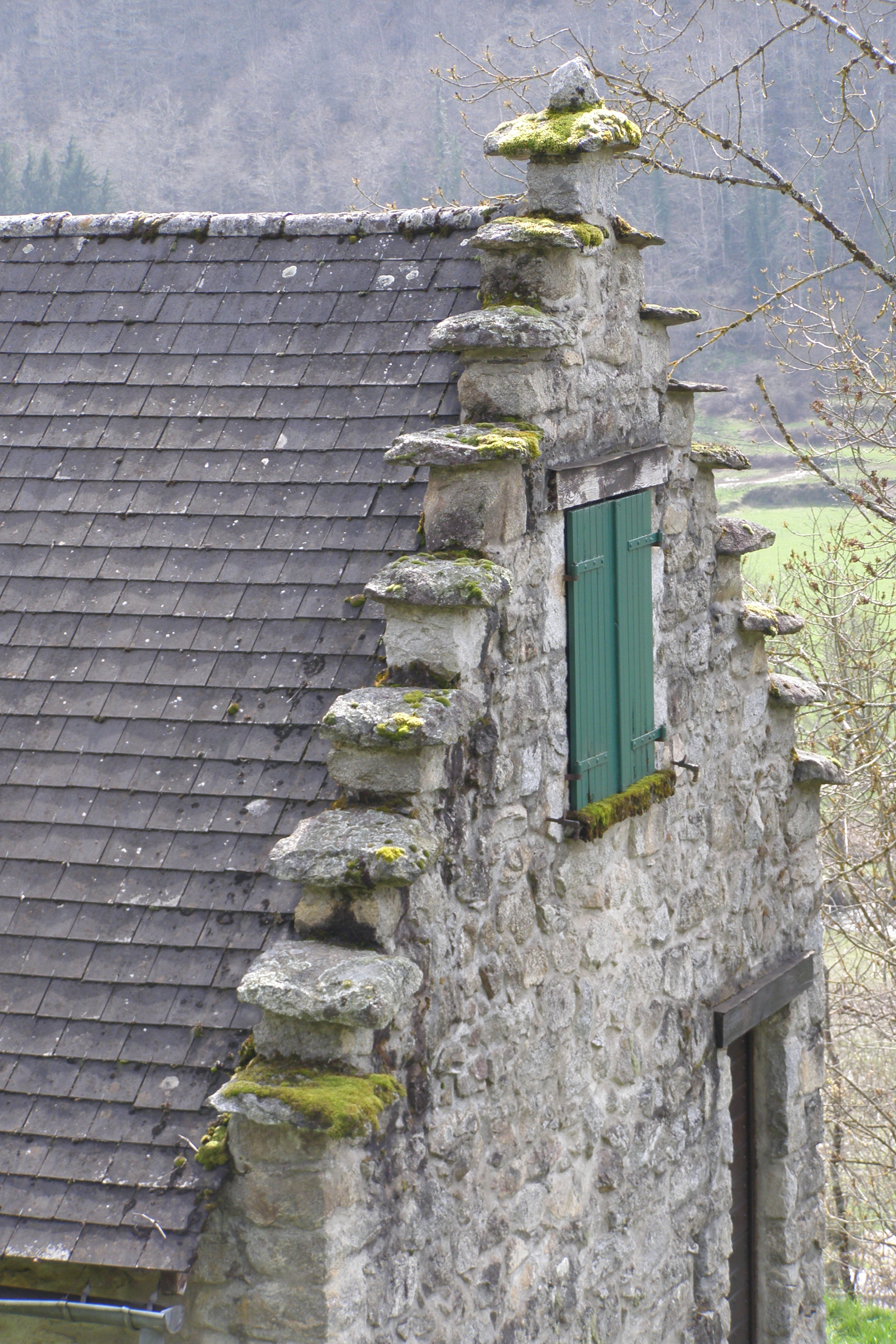
No sparrows in Couserans (Ariège).

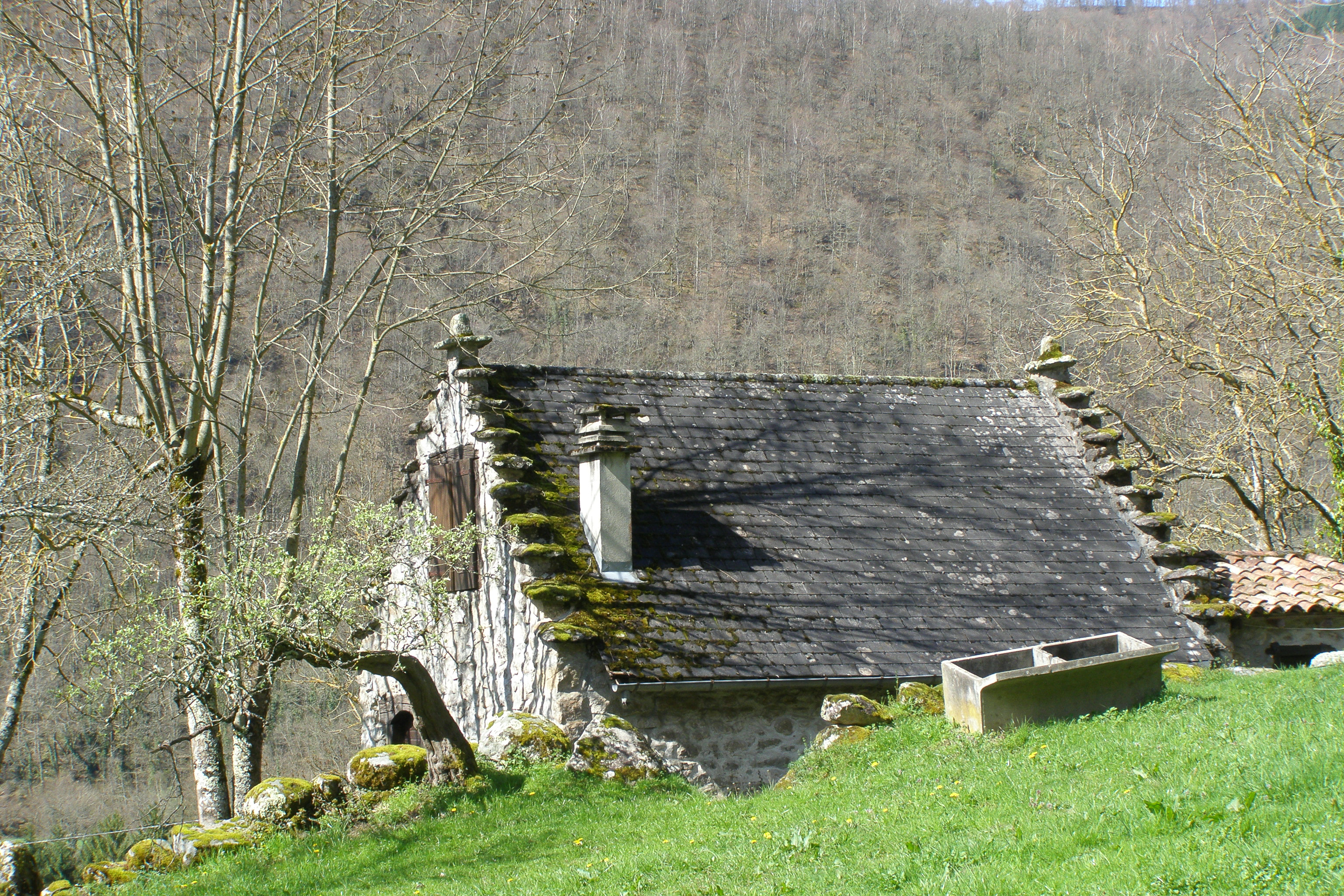
Renovated barn near Ercé (Ariège).

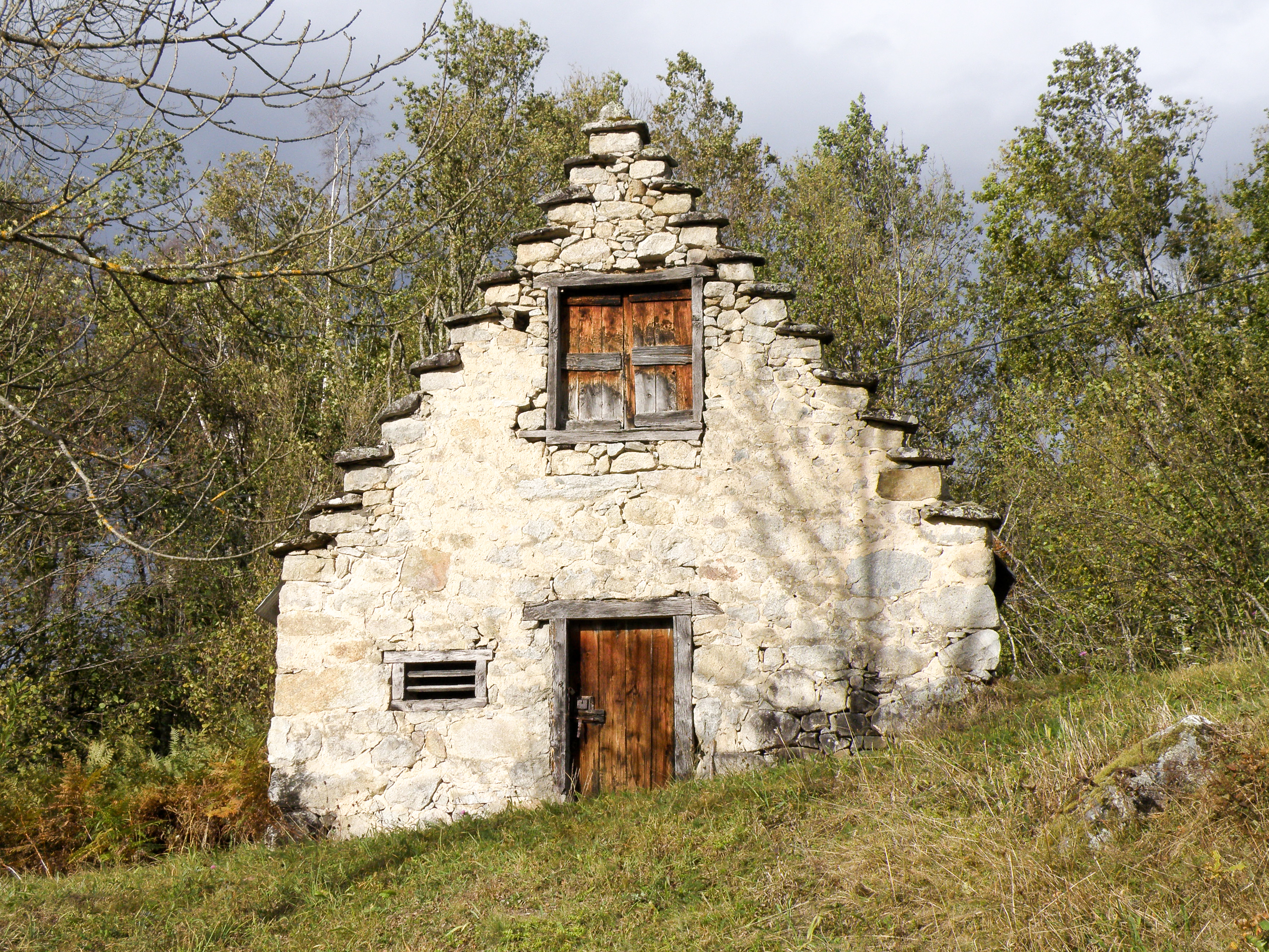
Barn near Cominac (Ariège).

==== Jura department ====
In the villages of the Jura and Franche-Comté vineyards, some traditional Jura houses are built with gabled roofs.

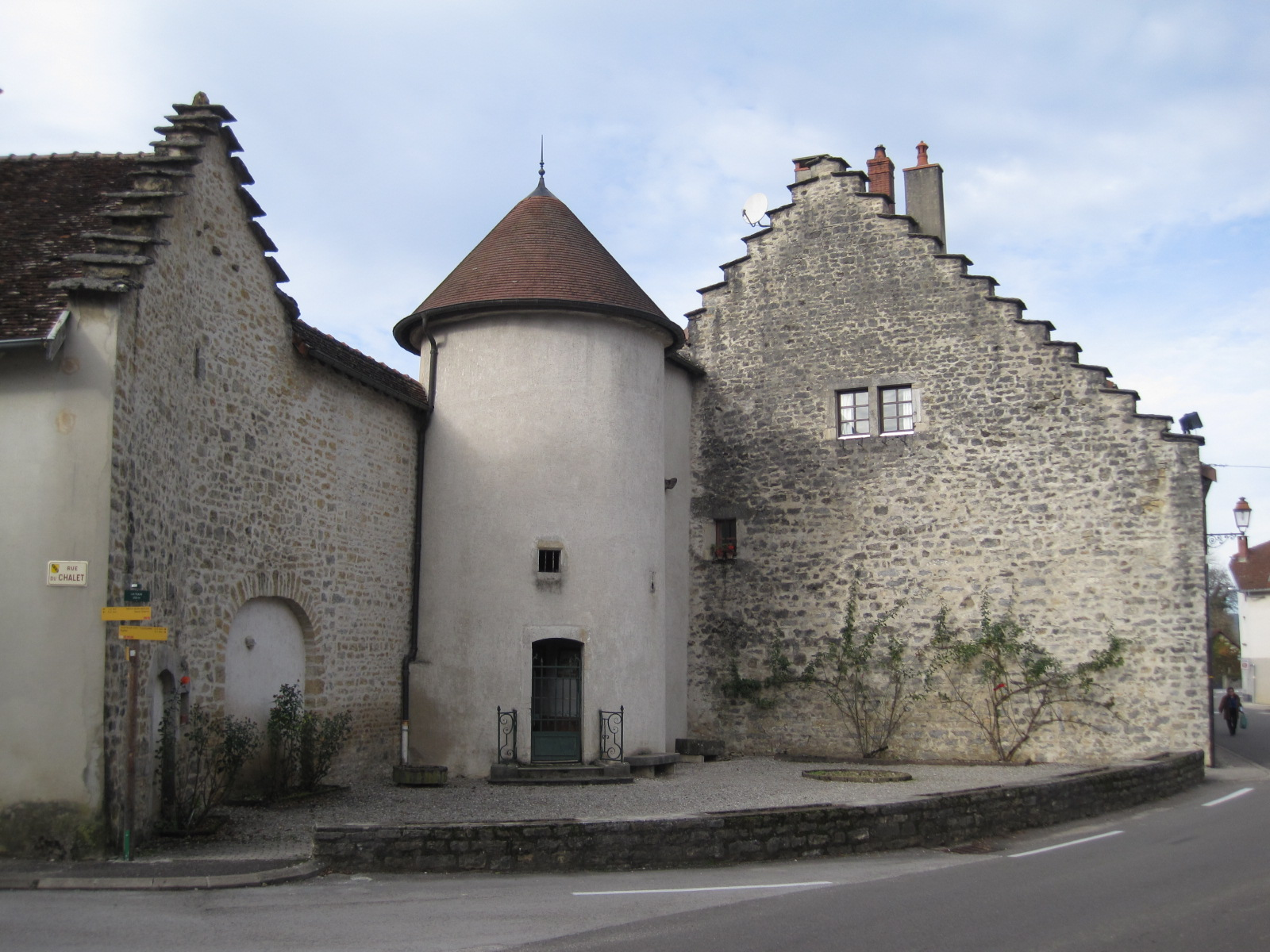
Voiteur, Jura vineyards.

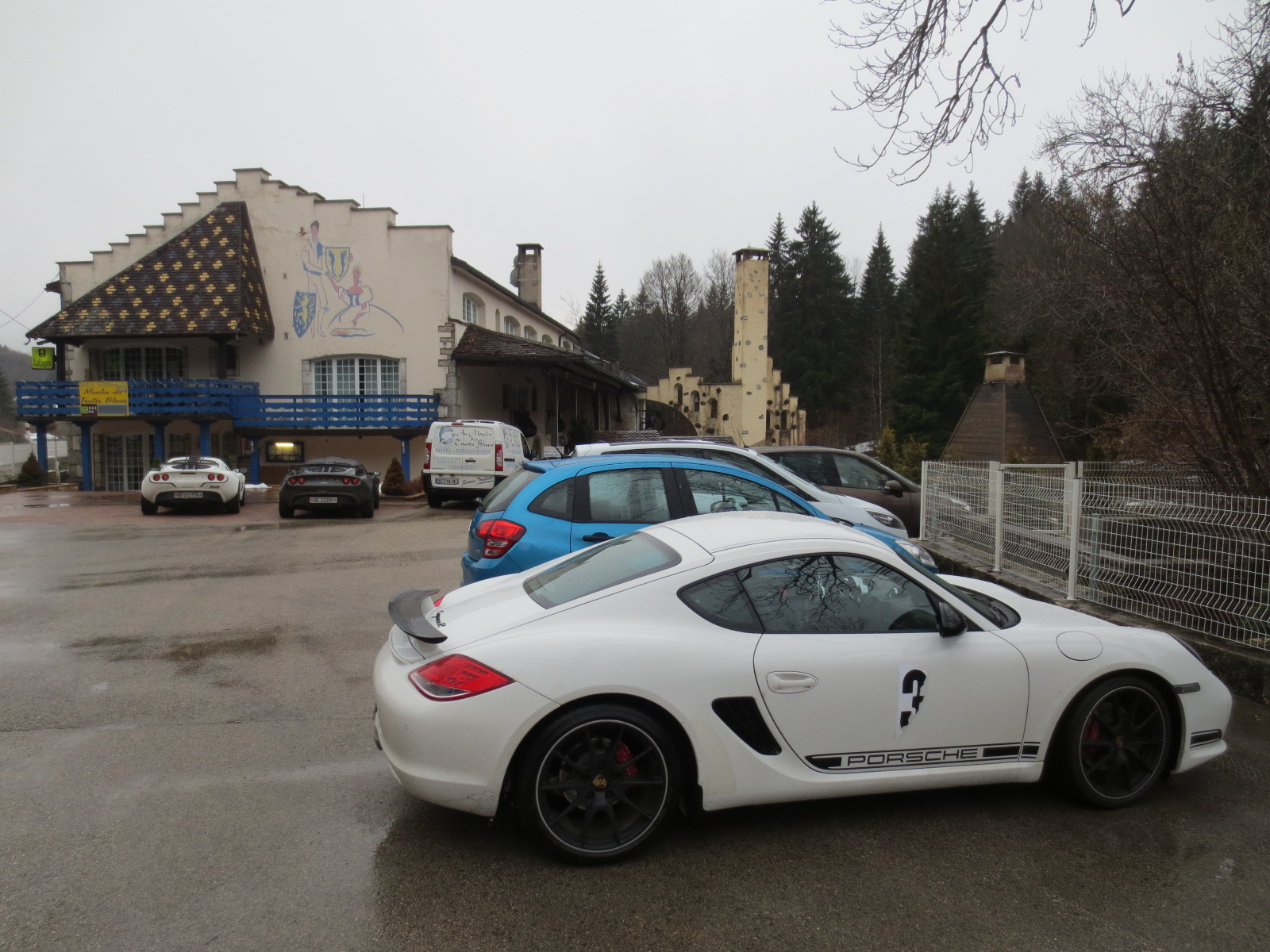
Saint-Laurent-en-Grandvaux.

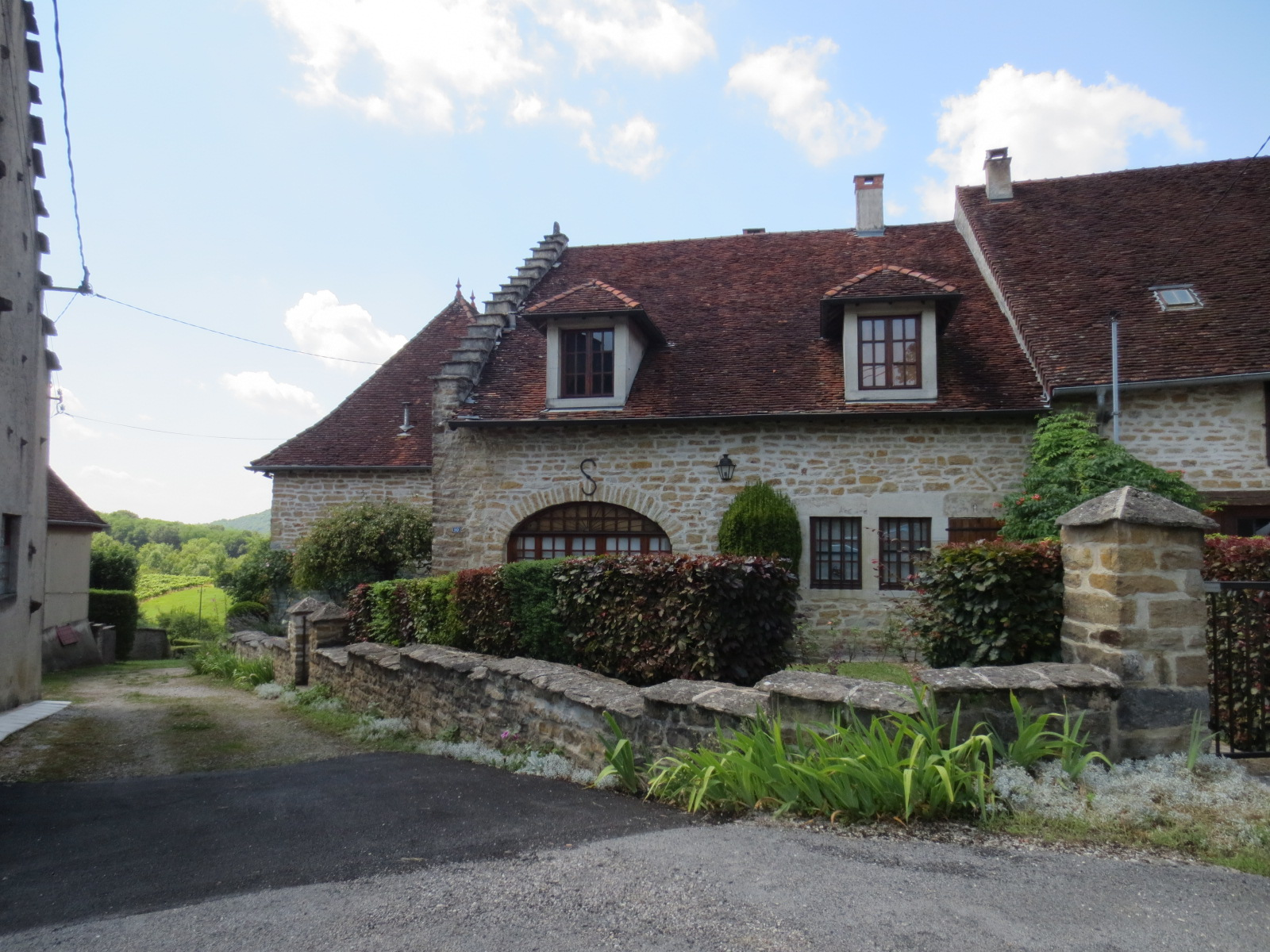
Tourist route of Jura wines.

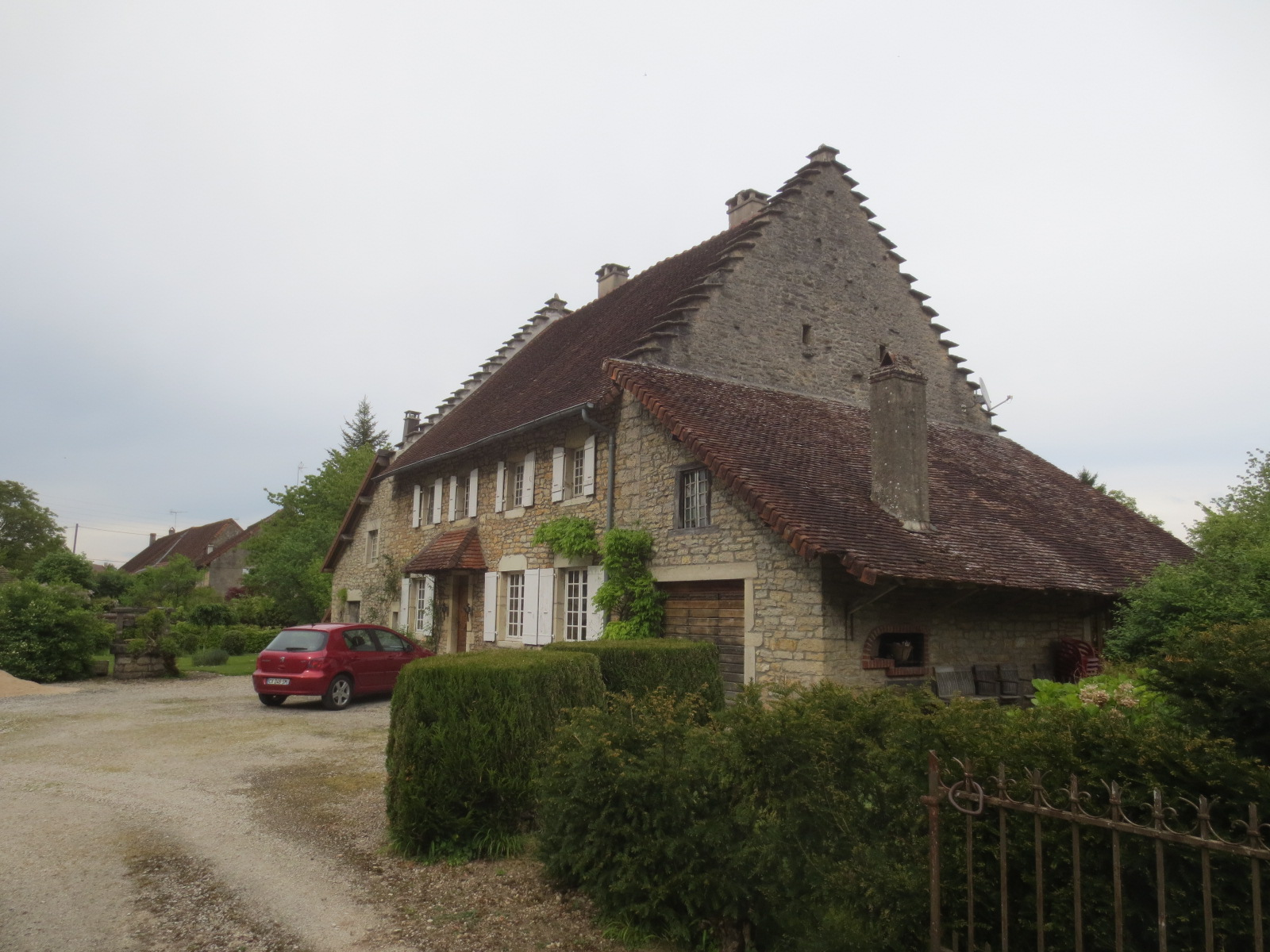
Tourist route of Jura wines.

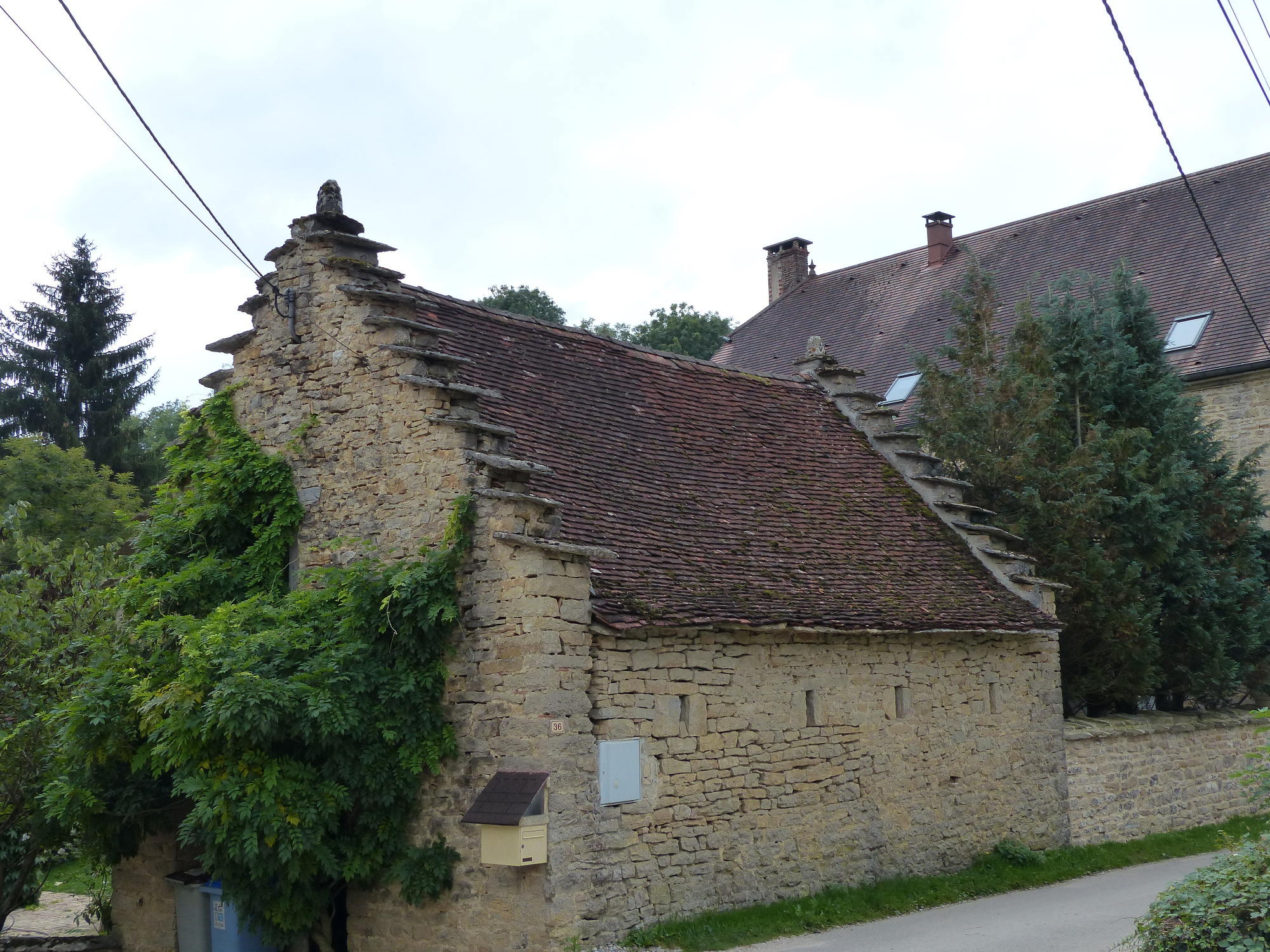
Quintigny.

==== Soissonnais ====
Stepped gables, also known as sparrow-stepped gables, can be found in villages along the Aisne valley, mainly in the Soissonnais region, where they are particularly numerous, if not widespread, and have characterized local rural architecture since the Middle Ages. They can be found on all types of buildings, mainly rural houses, but also manor houses, barns, town houses and church steeples. The term “crenellations” was formerly used to describe these steps. These are small steps, often consisting of a single ashlar course, not covered with flat stone. They have no credible utilitarian role. Their use is purely decorative or identity-related. Such gables are less common in other parts of northern France. Although Flanders is not far away, the gables of the Soissonnais are very different from those of Flanders in shape and structure, and the long history of this tradition in France makes it unlikely that the two are related.

The gables at Château de Pierrefonds, on the other hand, were designed by Viollet-le-Duc in the neo-Gothic style of the 19th century, and are a cross between Soissonnais and Flanders.

=== Urban architecture ===
There's also a more monumental, urban version of cusped gables, found mainly in northern Europe, whose function is exclusively decorative or symbolic.

==== Northern Europe ====
In Belgian and French Flanders, stepped gables became widespread from the Middle Ages onwards. They are probably the result of adapting the crenellations of fortified walls to sloping gables. A symbol of seigneurial housing, they were taken up by the powerful bourgeoisie of free market towns, to demonstrate the power they had acquired. The redents then quickly became widespread and a simple decorative motif, adorning even modest buildings. Redents are also sometimes fitted with merlons.

This type of gable, also known as “stepped gable” or “stepped gable”, is characteristic of many parts of Northern Europe. They can be found, with various local variations, in Flanders (in the broadest sense) and the Netherlands, but also throughout northern Germany, Poland, the Baltic states and Scandinavia, particularly in the former German Hanseatic towns, for which this type of gable is a striking architectural symbol, and where they spread at the same time as the backsteingotik (“brick Gothic”) style. They have also spread to more southerly Germanic regions, such as Bavaria, Alsace and Switzerland.

In Flanders and the Netherlands, their style is somewhat different (the steps are smaller and tend to be more numerous on each pitch, compared to the often large steps of northern Germany). They were a characteristic feature of urban construction where, by virtue of taxes on the width of houses, people came to build high and privilege this aspect of the facade. Horizontal divisions corresponding to storey heights often tended to be reduced in height, creating an optical effect of “false perspective” that accentuated the effect of height. From the Renaissance onwards, curves and scrolls began to appear, gradually eliminating the “stepped” appearance, although many were still preserved.

From the early 19th century to the present day, neo-regionalist architecture has revived the use of crenellated gables in both Belgian and French Flanders: Tournai's Grand-Place, the reconstruction of Ypres and Bailleul after the First World War, buildings in Lille, and so on.

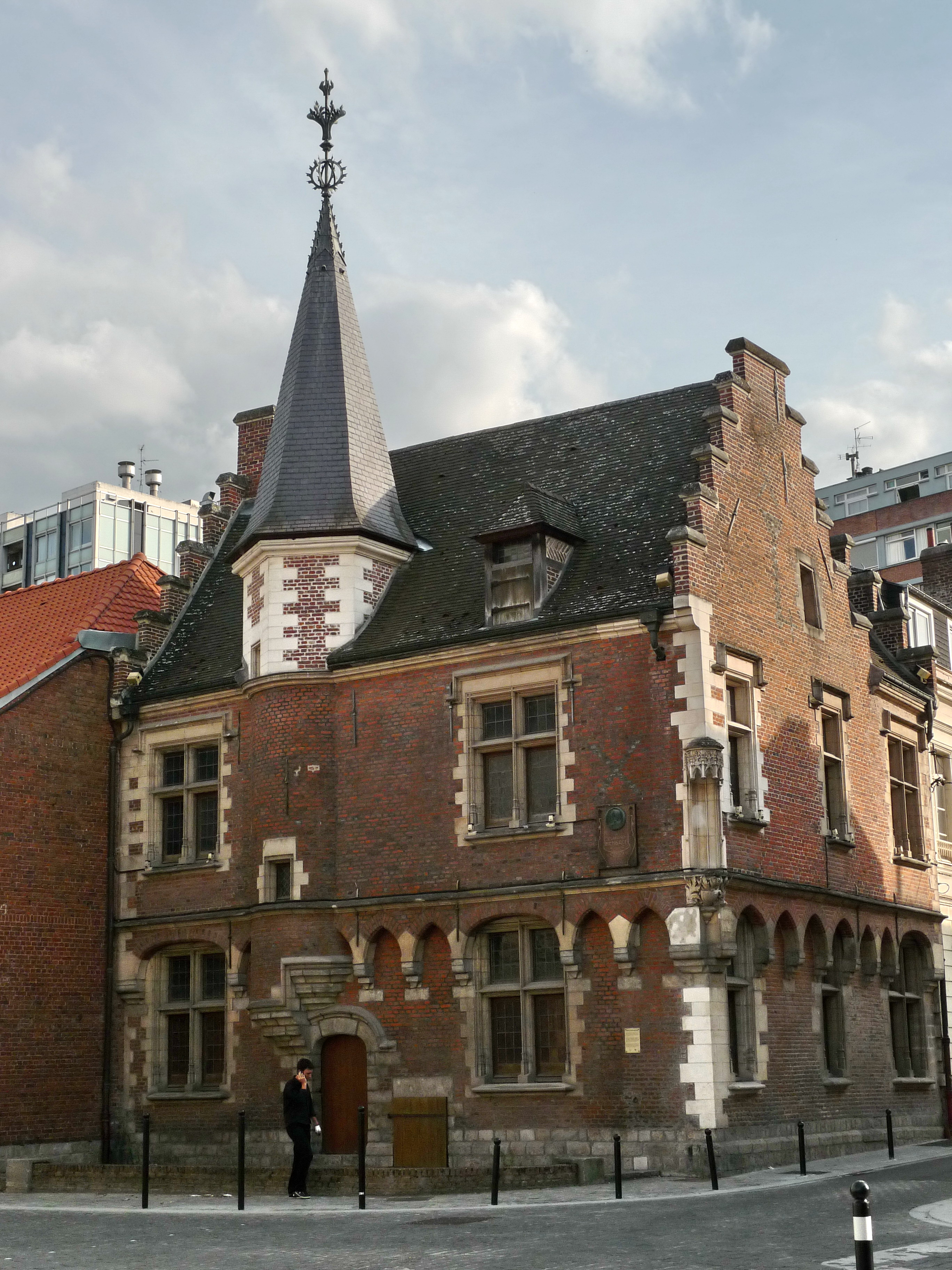
Provost's house in Valenciennes.

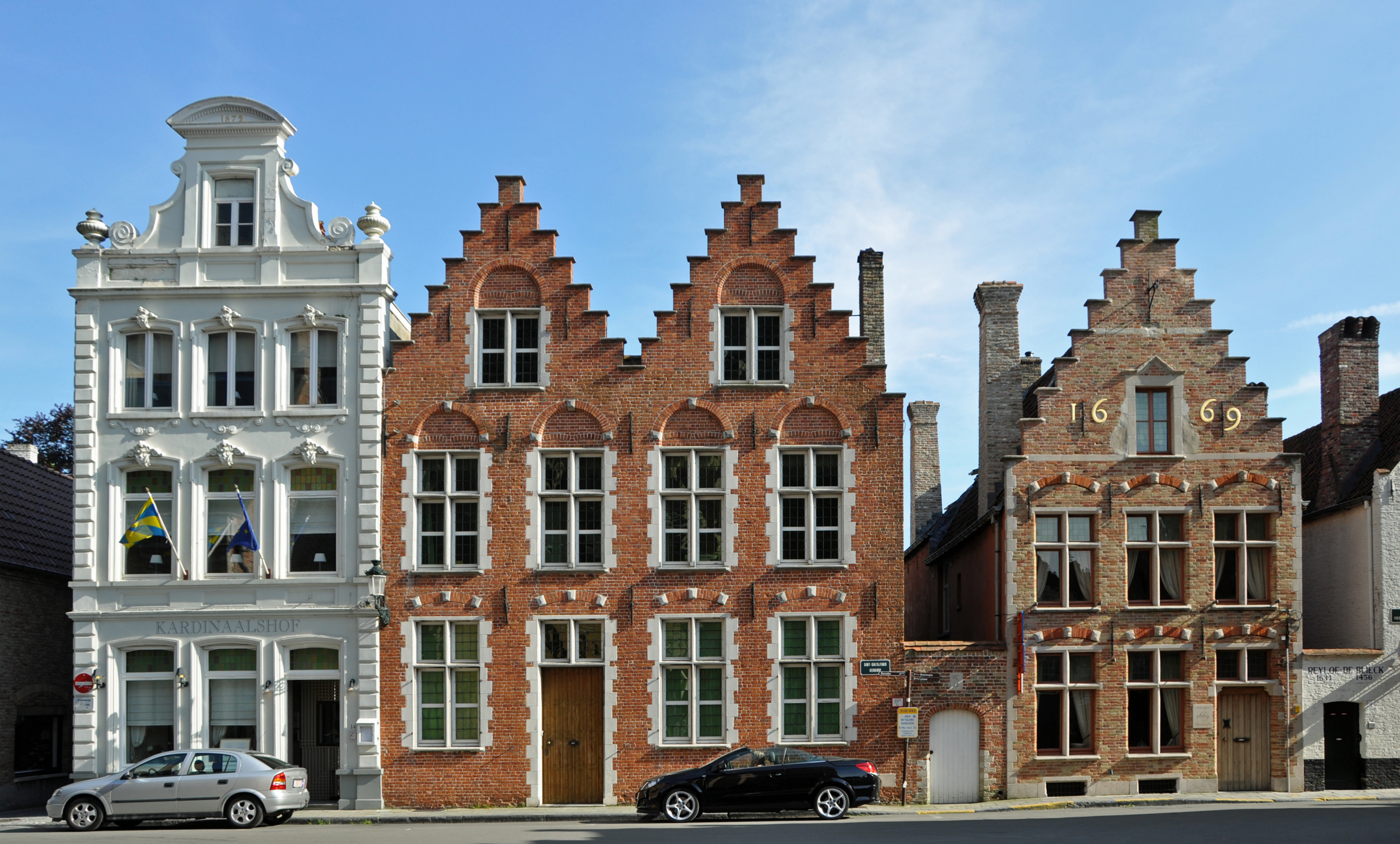
Old houses in Bruges (Belgium).

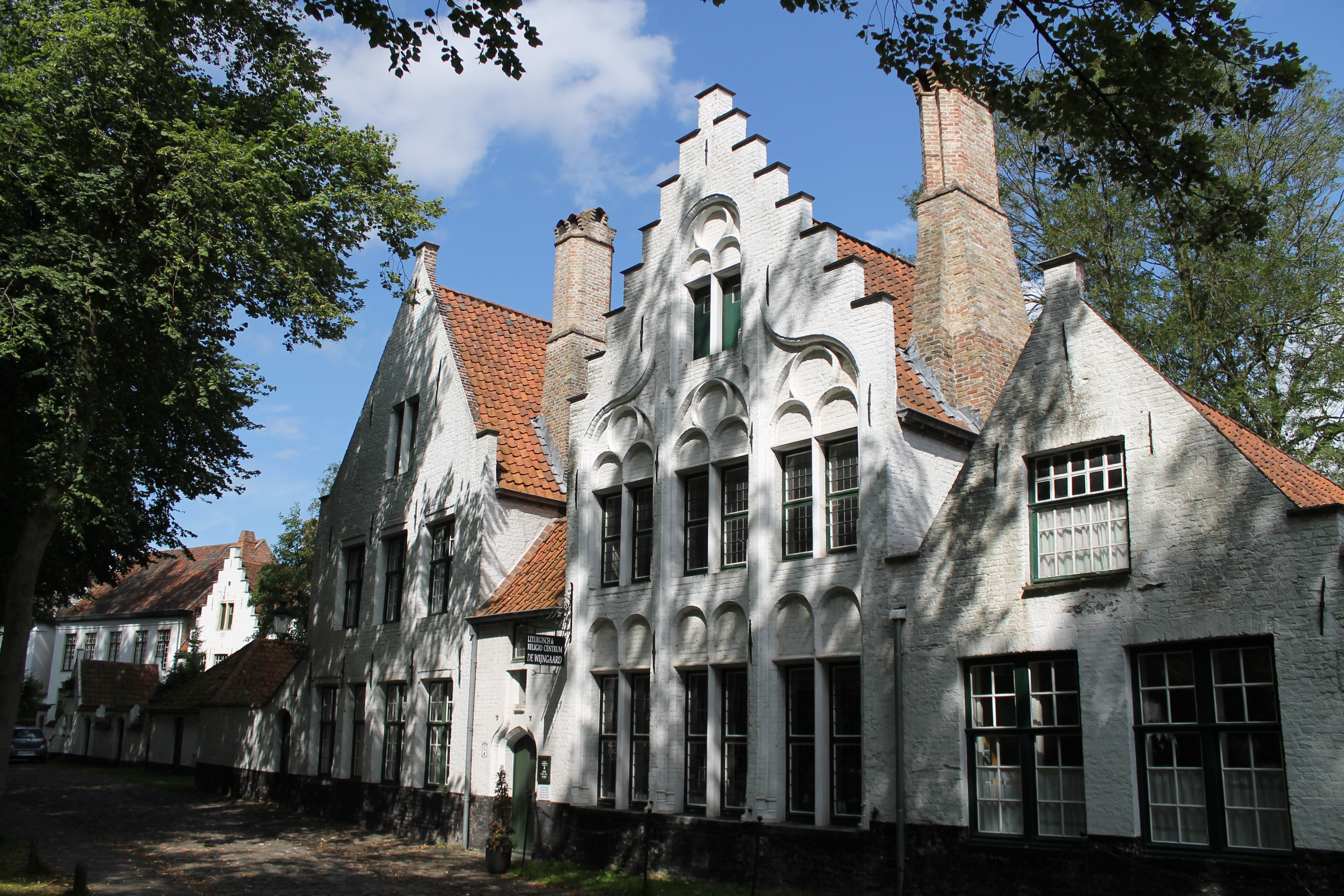
Gothic house in Bruges.

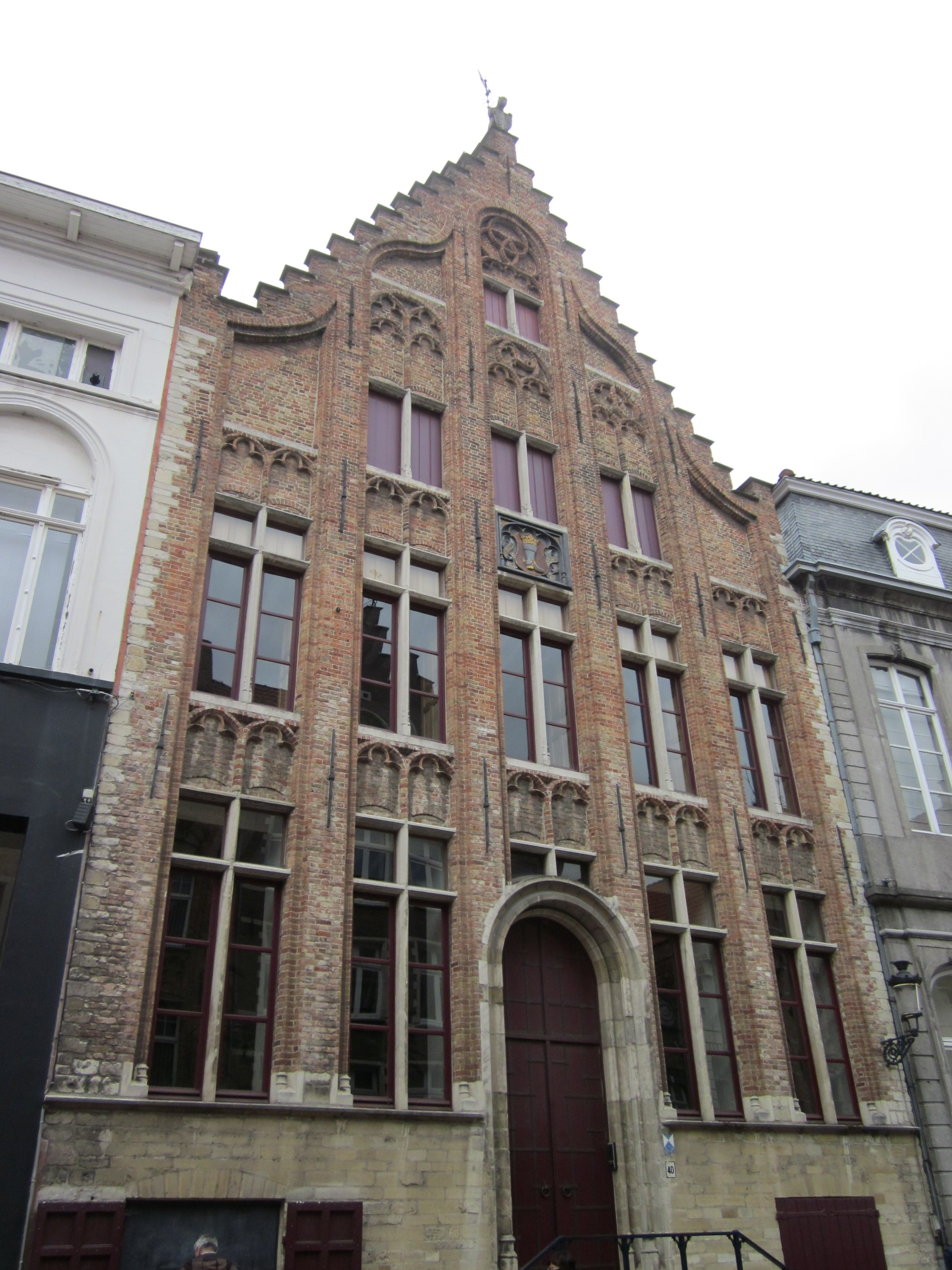
Gothic house in Bruges.

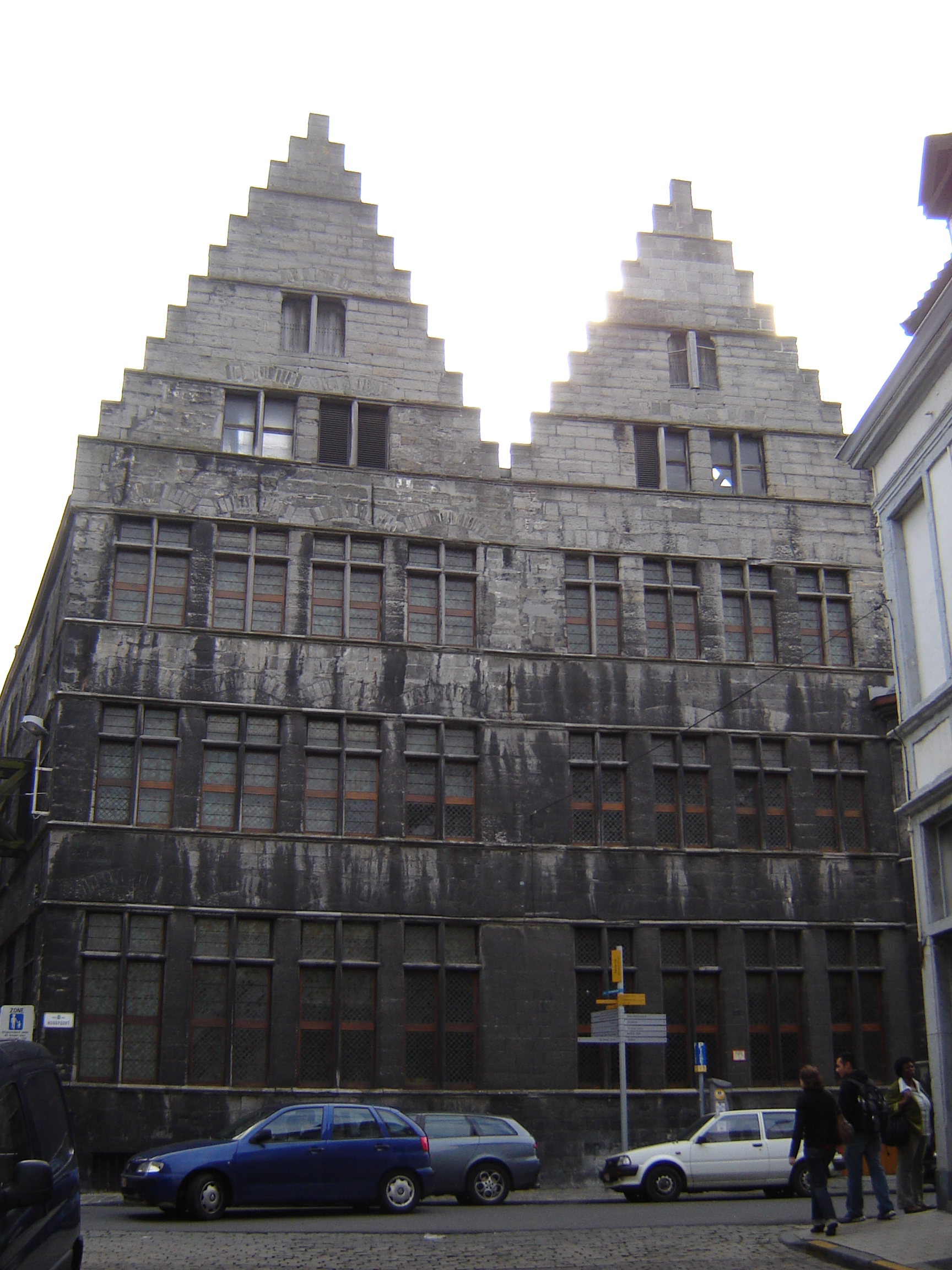
Grote Sikkel in Ghent (Belgium).

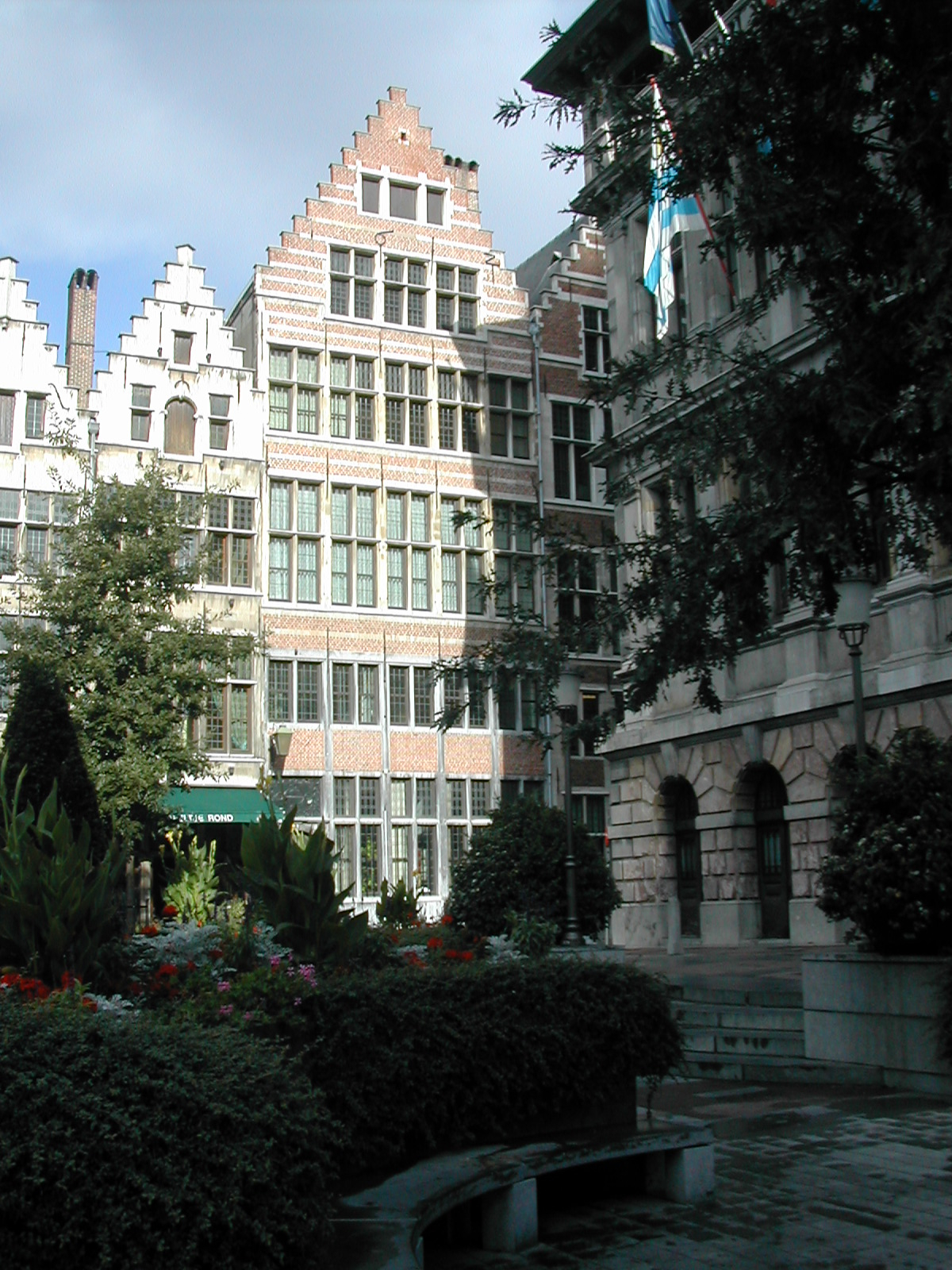
Guild houses in Antwerp (Belgium).

The Vleeshal in Haarlem (Netherlands).

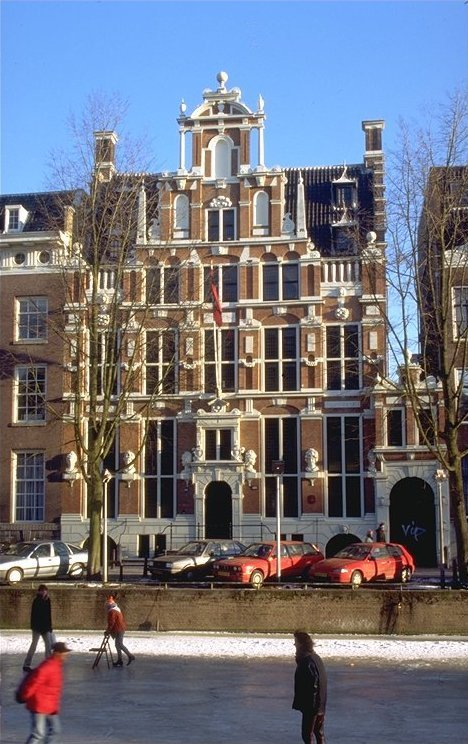
The Huis met de Hoofden in Amsterdam (Netherlands).

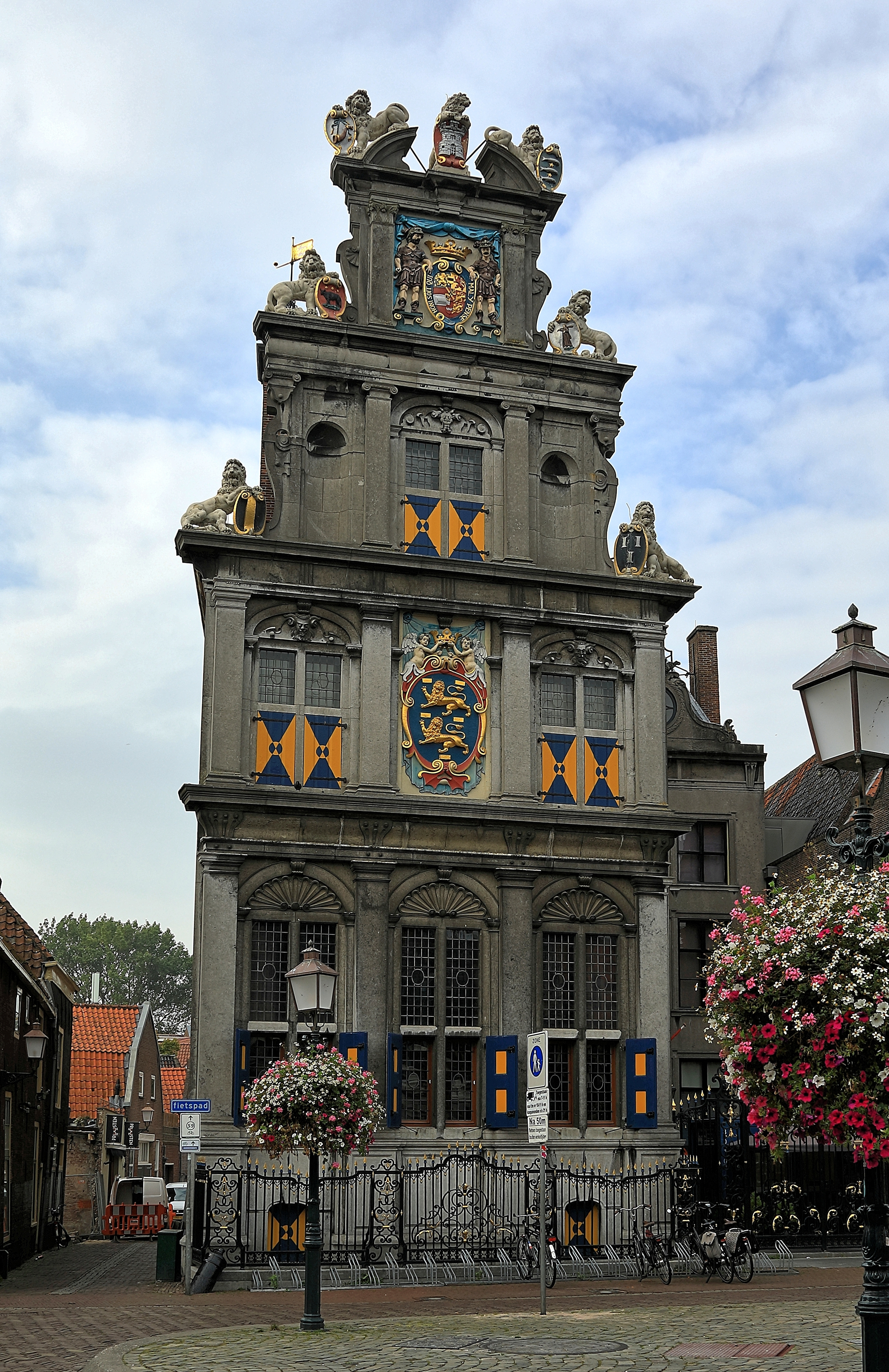
The Westfries Museum in Hoorn (Netherlands).

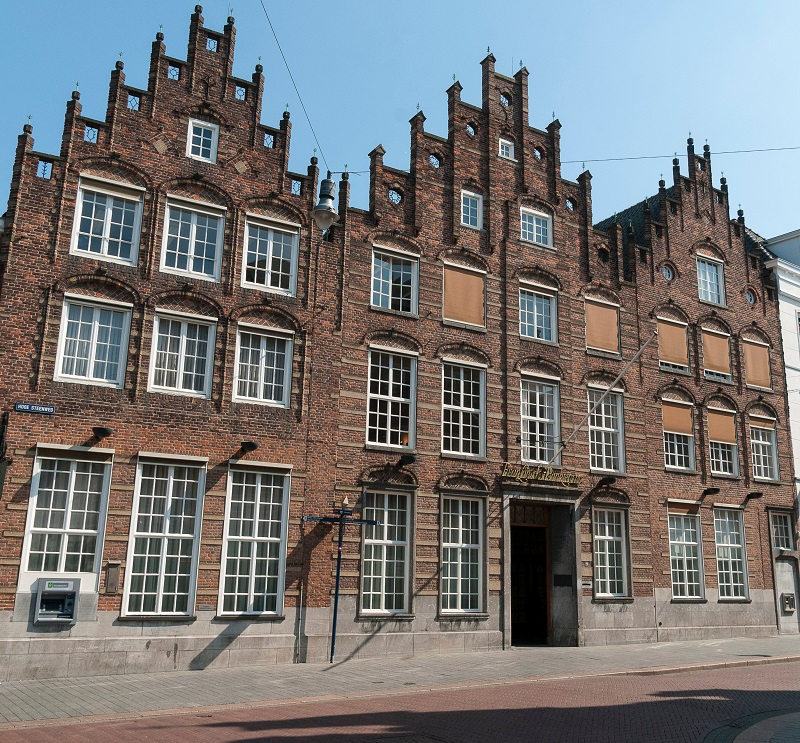
The Head Office of the banking Van Lanschot Kempen Hooge Steenweg 29, in 's-Hertogenbosch (Netherlands).

== Construction ==
Convenient access to the roof ridge motivated the crow-step design, along with the availability of squarish stones to accomplish this form of construction. The access would have been convenient for chimney sweeps and roofers in earlier times, where cranes were non-existent and tall ladders were not common.

With crow steps, the roofing slates (rarely tiles) do not reach the end of the building, so making for a special problem with keeping the roof watertight. Many different schemes are found for overcoming this, some of which are described below. Terms currently used in Scotland are italicised.

- Slates may be laid to the edge of the crow step, with the last slate raised by a wedge (tilting fillet). Then mortar (lime mortar or cement) would be laid over the edge of the slate to seal the gap. Other solutions involve working with lead.
- A groove approximately 25 mm (1 inch) deep is cut into the inside edge of the steps. A lead abutment flashing is inserted into this groove, called a chase or a raggle. The lead is laid over the end slate, which is raised by a tilting fillet.
- Leading is inserted into a raggle, and used to make a trough, or secret gutter, running down the inside edge of the steps. The far edge of the trough is raised over a triangular fillet. Slates are then laid resting on that trough edge and overlapping into the trough, which is open and runs directly down to gutters (roans).
- Rather than forming a raggle, lead flashings may be placed into the joints between bricks as they are laid.

When lead is to be held into a raggle, small folded lead wedges called bats are inserted at intervals and hammered in so they expand. The raggle is then sealed with mortar. Crow steps are frequently made of sandstone, even on buildings otherwise of granite, and it is said that the porous nature of sandstone leads to problems with water penetration. Because of this, crow steps are sometimes capped with lead or sealed with other materials.

== Design variation ==
There are a number of variations on the basic design. One such structure is Culross Palace built in 1597 which features a veiled woman on the crow steps. Roofs in Scotland are typically steeper than in the rest of the United Kingdom (possibly because it snows more) making for steeper and more step-like steps.

== Alternative terms ==
The Nuttall Encyclopædia suggests this architectural feature is called corble steps. Corbie steps (from the Scots language corbie: crow) is a more common version. Another term sometimes used is craw step. In Dutch, this design is termed trapgevel ("stair-step facade"), characteristic of many brick buildings in the Netherlands, Belgium, and in Dutch colonial settlements.

A similar form is found in traditional Chinese architecture called zh:馬頭牆 (pinyin: mǎtóu qiáng), which literally means "horse-head wall".

== See also ==
- Cornice
- Pediment
- Dutch gable
- Redan
- Flagstone
- Ziggurat
