= Flashing (weatherproofing) =

Construction technique

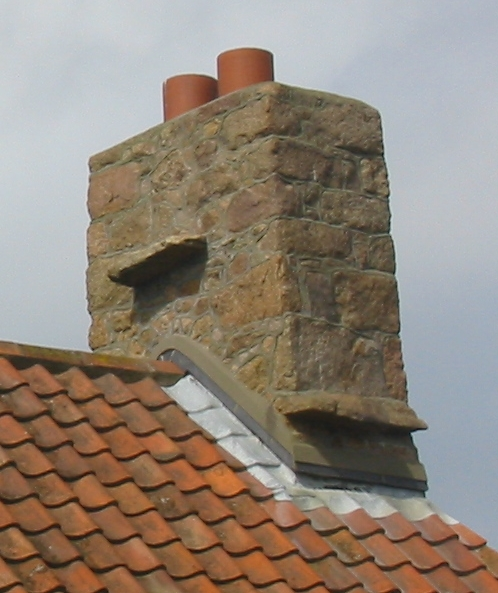
Weatherproofing seam between a stone chimney and a tile roof on a building in Jersey, Channel Islands. The lead flashing is seen as light gray sheets at the base of the chimney.

Flashing is thin pieces of impervious material installed to prevent the passage of water into a structure from a joint or as part of a weather resistant barrier system. In modern buildings, flashing is intended to decrease water penetration at objects such as chimneys, vent pipes, walls, windows and door openings to make buildings more durable and to reduce indoor mold problems. Metal flashing materials include lead, aluminium, copper, stainless steel, zinc alloy, and other materials.

== Etymology and related terms ==
The origin of the term flash and flashing are uncertain, but may come from the Middle English verb flasshen, 'to sprinkle, splash', related to flask.

Counter-flashing (or cover flashing, cap flashing) is a term used when there are two parallel pieces of flashing employed together such as on a chimney, where the counter-flashing is built into the chimney and overlaps a replaceable piece of base flashing. Strips of lead used for flashing an edge were sometimes called an apron, and the term is still used for the piece of flashing below a chimney. The up-hill side of a chimney may have a small gable-like assembly called a cricket with cricket flashing or on narrow chimneys with no cricket a back flashing or back pan flashing. Flashing may be let into a groove in a wall or chimney called a reglet.

== Purpose ==
Before the availability of sheet products for flashing, builders used creative methods to minimize water penetration. These methods included angling roof shingles away from the joint, placing chimneys at the ridge, building steps into the sides of chimneys to throw off water, and covering the seams between roofing materials with mortar flaunching. The introduction of manufactured flashing decreased water penetration at obstacles such as chimneys, vent pipes, walls which abut roofs, window and door openings, etc., thus making buildings more durable and reducing indoor mold problems. It is also essential to prevent leaks around skylights or roof windows. Moreover, flashing is important to ensure the integrity of a roof prior to a solar panel installation.

Builders' books, such as Loudons An Encyclopædia of Cottage, Farm, and Villa Architecture and Furniture... gave instructions on installing lead flashing by 1832 and in 1875 Notes on Building Construction provided detailed instruction and is well illustrated with methods still used today.

Flashing may be exposed or concealed. Exposed flashing is usually of a sheet metal, while concealed flashing may be metal or a flexible, adhesive-backed material, particularly around wall penetrations such as window and door openings.

== Materials ==
In earlier days, birch bark was occasionally used as a flashing material. Most flashing materials today are metal, plastic, rubber, or impregnated paper.

Metal flashing materials include lead, aluminium, copper, stainless steel, zinc alloy, other architectural metals or a metal with a coating such as galvanized steel, lead-coated copper, anodized aluminium, terne-coated copper, galvalume (aluminium-zinc alloy coated sheet steel), and metals similar to stone-coated metal roofing. Metal flashing should be provided with expansion joints on long runs to prevent deformation of the metal sheets due to expansion and contraction, and should not stain or be stained by adjacent materials or react chemically with them.

An important type of potential chemical reaction between metal flashing materials is galvanic corrosion. Copper and lead cannot be used in contact with or even above aluminium, zinc, or coated steel without an increased risk of premature corrosion. Also, aluminium and zinc flashing cannot be used in contact with pressure treated wood due to rapid corrosion. Aluminium is also damaged by wet mortar and wet plaster. Salt spray in coastal areas may accelerate corrosion; so stainless steel, copper, or coated aluminium are recommended flashing materials near salt water.

Types of flexible flashing products are rubberized asphalt, butyl rubber, polyvinylidene fluoride (sometimes known as kylar or hylar), and acrylic. The different types have different application temperature ranges, material adhesion compatibility, chemical compatibility, levels of volatile organic compounds, and resistance to ultraviolet light exposure. Adhesive backed materials can aid installation, but such adhesives are not intended for long-term water-resistance.

Copper is an excellent material for flashing because of its malleability, strength, solder-ability, workability, high resistance to the caustic effects of mortars and hostile environments, and long service life (see: copper flashing). This enables a roof to be built without weak points. Since flashing is expensive to replace if it fails, copper's long life is a major cost advantage.

Cold rolled (to 1/8-hard temper) copper is recommended for most flashing applications. This material offers more resistance than soft copper to the stresses of expansion and contraction. Soft copper can be specified where extreme forming is required, such as in complicated roof shapes. Thermal movement in flashings is prevented or is permitted only at predetermined locations.

"Soft zinc" is a newer, proprietary flashing material. It is a relatively malleable material, making it useful for complex roofing connections. It provides normal soft soldering capabilities and delivers easy folding. Soft zinc is said to be an "environmentally friendly" replacement for lead flashing; like lead, it is recyclable, while avoiding lead-contaminated runoff.

== Types ==
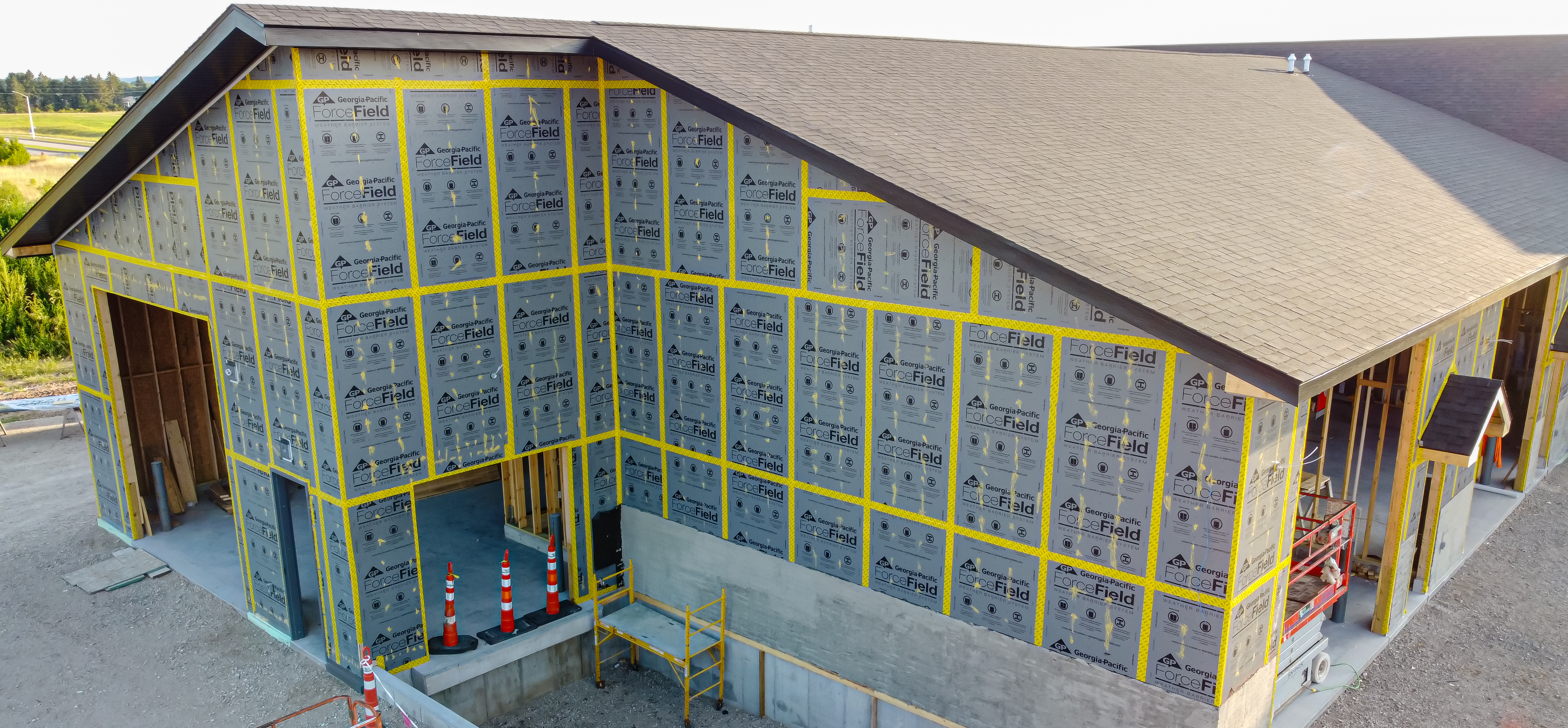
Moisture barrier sheathing with flashing tape can replace housewrap

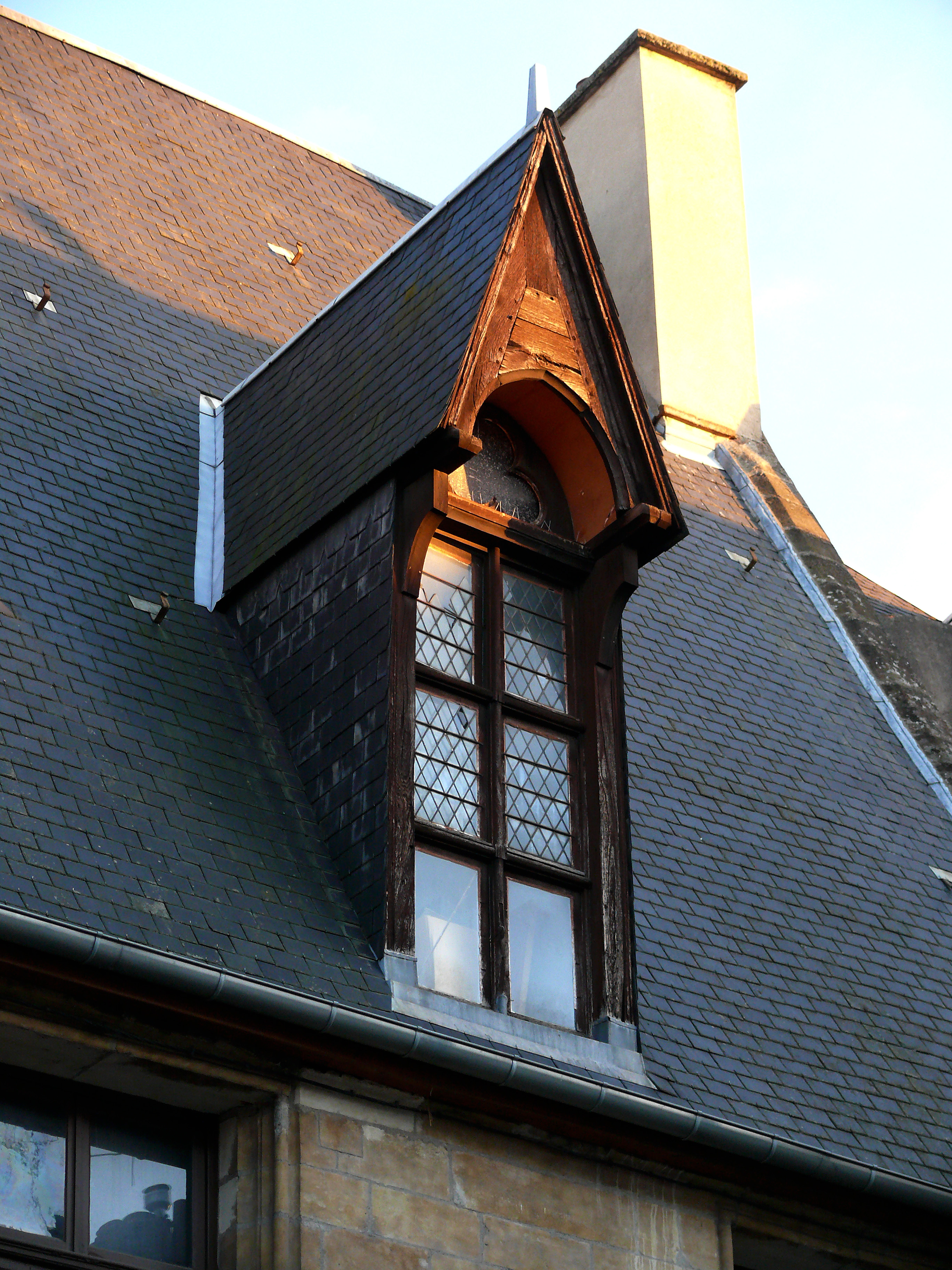
The flashing visible here is the apron below the dormer and the valley flashing in the open valley. The step flashing (soakers) are properly installed underneath the roof and wall shingles and thus is not visible. Hôtel Demoret Moulins, France

Flashing types are named according to location or shape:

Roof flashing
Placed around discontinuities or objects which protrude from the roof of a building to deflect water away from seams or joints and in valleys where the runoff is concentrated.
Wall flashing
May be embedded in a wall to direct water that has penetrated the wall back outside, or it may be applied in a manner intended to prevent the entry of water into the wall. Wall flashing is typically found at interruptions in the wall, such as windows and points of structural support.
Sill flashing (or sill pan)
A concealed flashing placed under windows or door thresholds to prevent water from entering a wall at those points.
Roof penetration flashing
Used to waterproof pipes, supports, cables, and all roof protrusions. Stainless steel penetration flashings have proven to be the longest lasting and most reliable roof flashing type.
Channel flashing
Shaped like a “U” or channel to catch water (e.g., where the edge of a tile roof meets a wall).
Through wall flashing
Spans the thickness of the wall and directs water to weep holes.
Cap flashing (drip cap)
Often used above windows and doors.
Drip edge
A metal used at the edges of a roof.
Step flashing (soaker, base flashing)
Pieces of flashing material which overlap each other in "steps".
Counter flashing (cap flashing)
Covers a base flashing.
Pipe flashing (pipe boot, vent boot, pipe flange)
A product used where pipes penetrate roofs.
Chimney flashing
A general term for flashing a chimney to cover the intersections of the chimney and install a damp proof course (DPC)
Kickout flashing
At the very bottom of a roof/wall intersection, the lowermost step flashing specially formed to deflect water away from the wall.
Valley flashing
In the valley of two intersecting roof planes.

A structure incorporating flashing has to be carefully engineered and constructed so that water is directed away from the structure and not inside. Flashing improperly installed can direct water into a building.

== Environmental impact ==
In the US and UK, at least, lead flashing and fittings are still readily available, despite the environmental concerns associated with bulk use of this heavy metal. The Lead Sheet Association touts its recyclability and extreme durability.

== See also ==
- Damp proofing
- Housewrap
- Rainscreen
