= Reglet =

Masonry groove

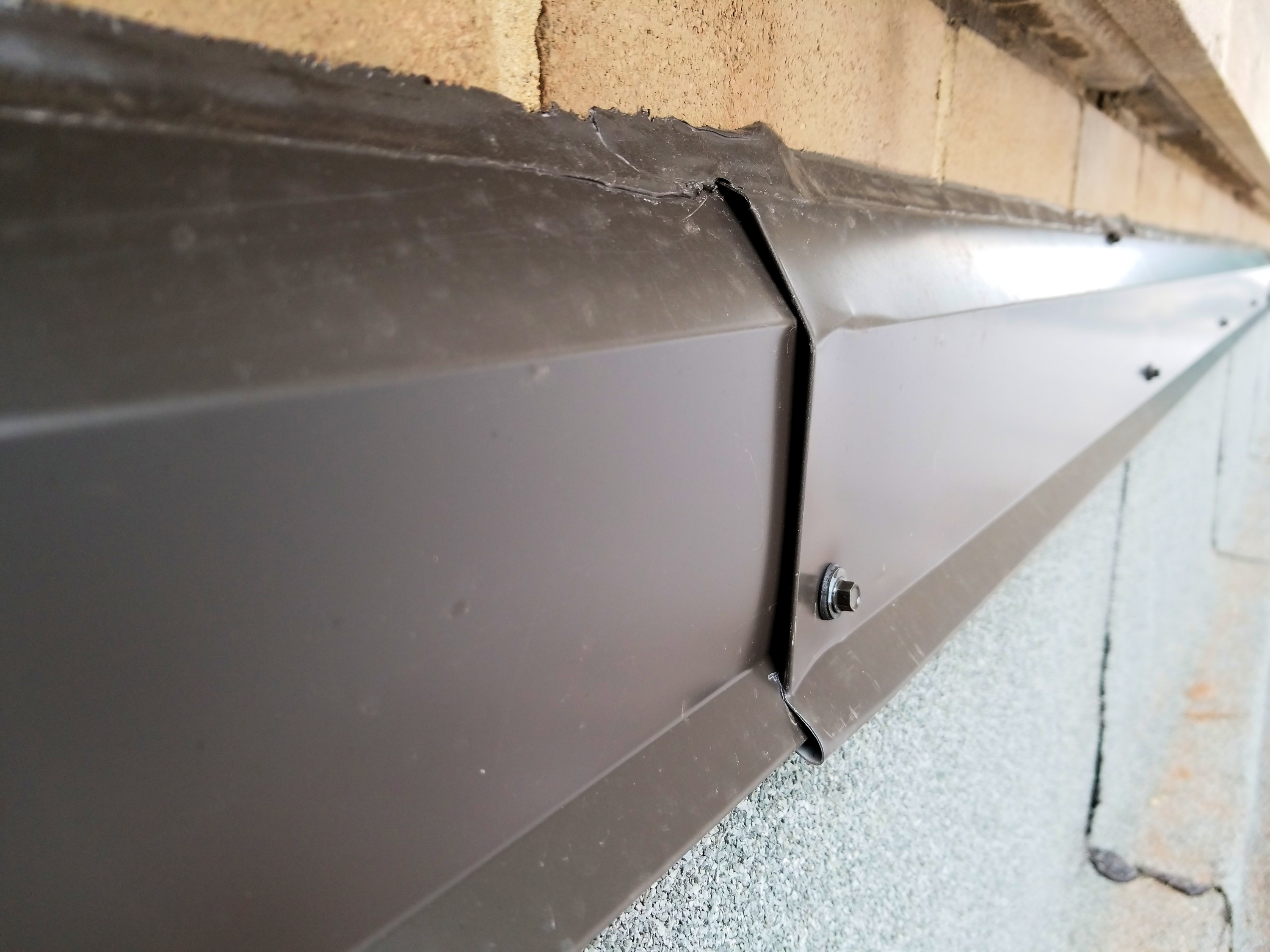
Reglet detail

A reglet is found on the exterior of a building along a masonry wall, chimney or parapet that meets the roof. It is a groove cut within a mortar joint that receives counter-flashing meant to cover surface flashing used to deflect water infiltration. Reglet can also refer to the counter-flashing itself when it is applied on the surface, known as "face reglet" or "reglet-flashing".

== Description ==
=== Reglet Groove ===
The reglet is created typically with a grinder or masonry cutting saw that cuts 3/4" to 1-1/2" deep into a mortar joint between two bricks. The counter-flashing is then inserted to the reglet and held in place with thin metal wedge covered with a sealant.

=== Face Reglet ===
A face reglet (also known as reglet-flashing) is counter-flashing that is typically made out of either copper or lead-coated copper. It is applied on the surface of the wall or parapet and screwed into place, with additional sealant placed between the surface and the counter-flashing. It is easily removable for roof repair and flashing replacements.

A face reglet can also be called a raggle and may be related to regle, a groove.

== Assembly ==
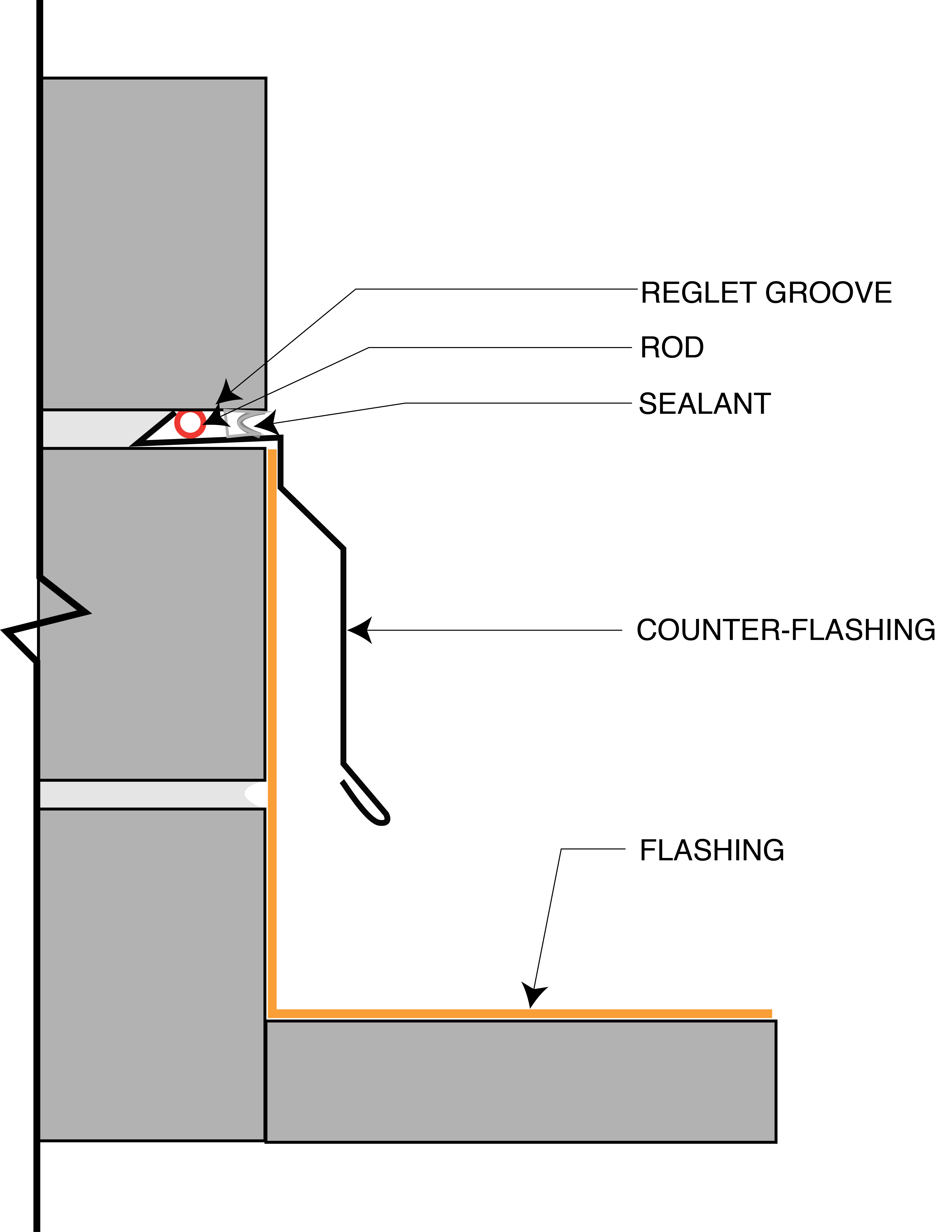
Section of Reglet Groove and counter-flashing insert

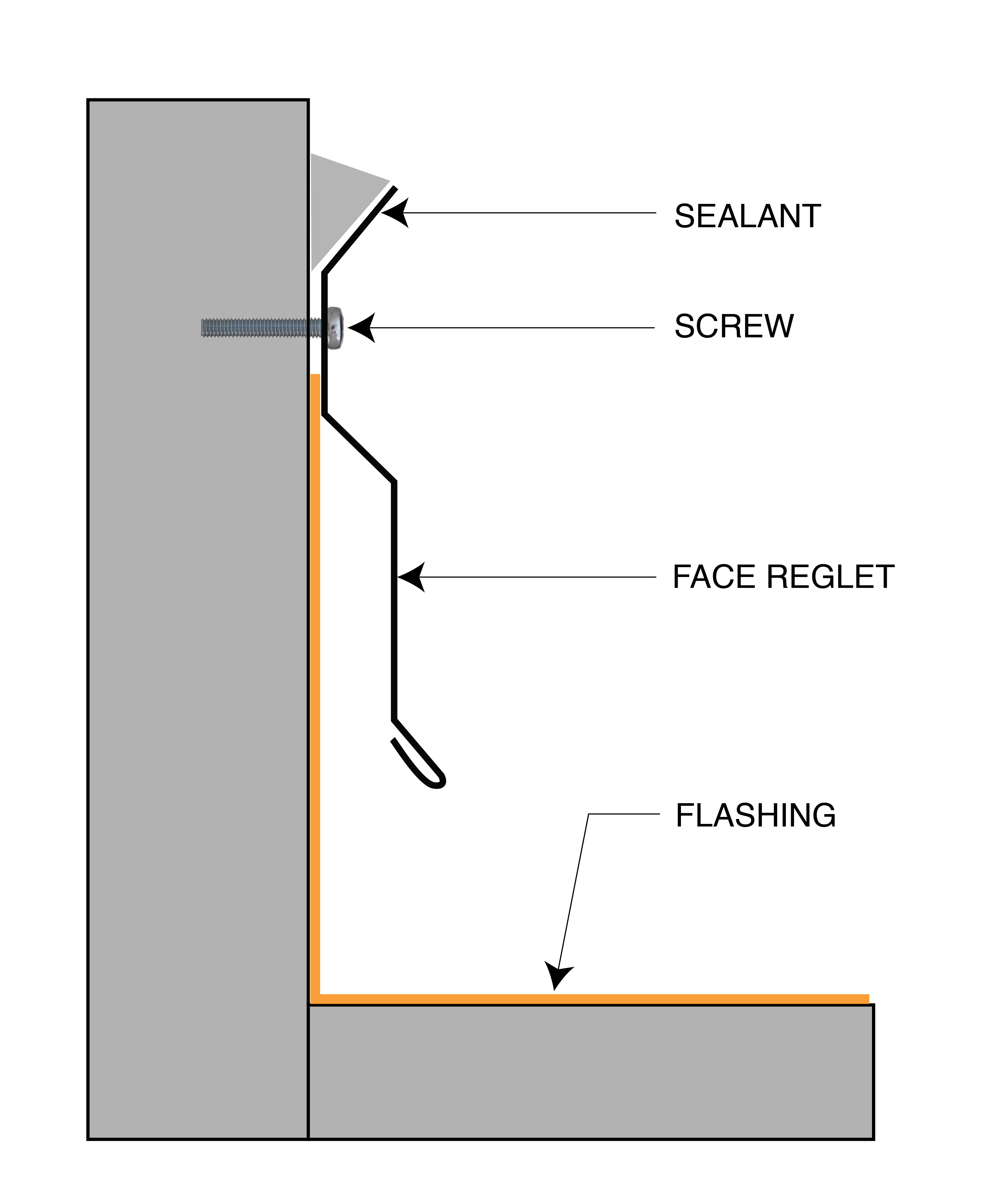
Section of Face Reglet and attachment to masonry wall

== See also ==
- Flashing
