= Prémeyzel =

Commune in Auvergne-Rhône-Alpes, France

- Commune
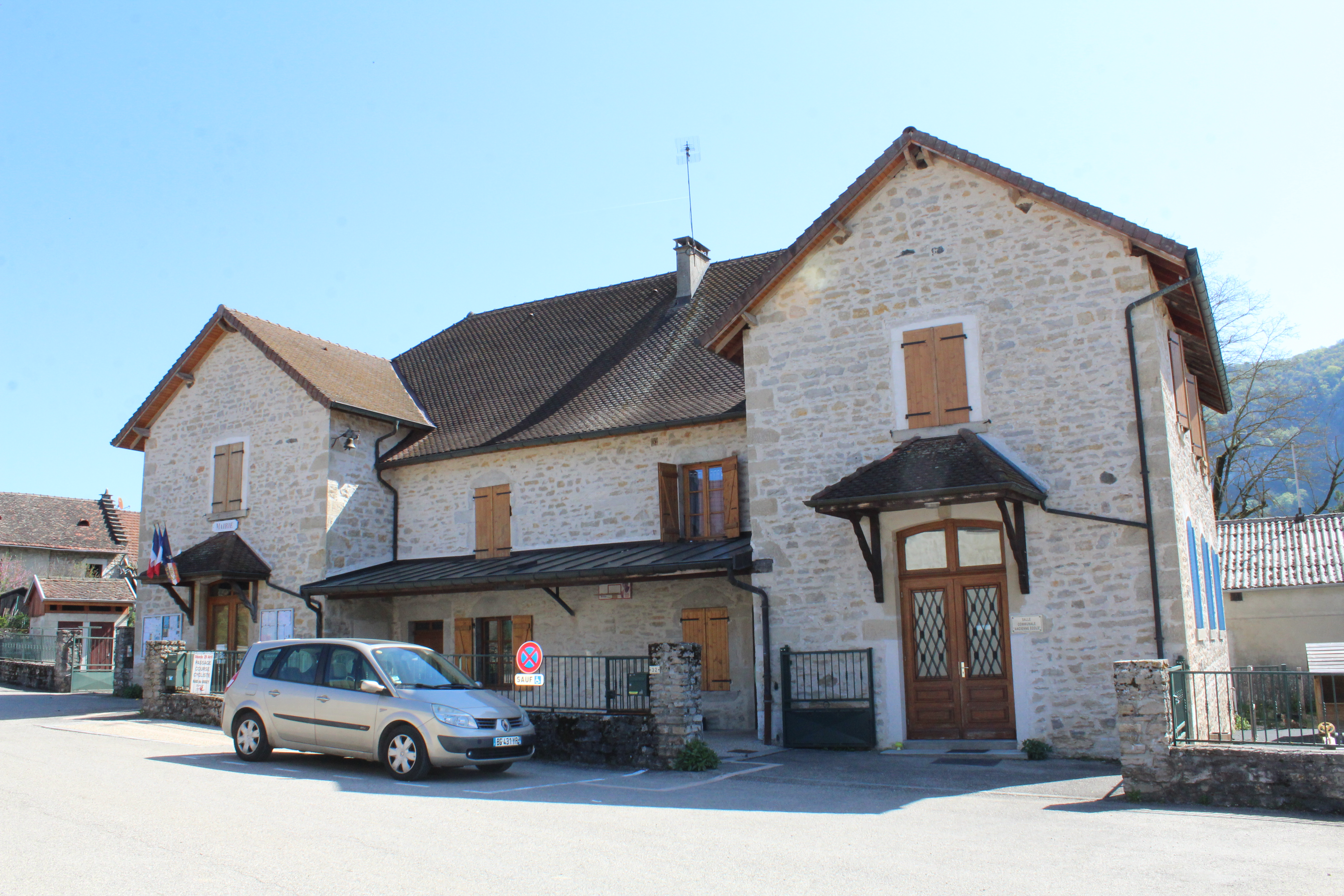
- Town hall

- Coat of arms
- Location of Prémeyzel
- Location within France Location within Auvergne-Rhône-Alpes
- Coordinates: 45°41′00″N 5°39′00″E
- Country: France
- Region: Auvergne-Rhône-Alpes
- Department: Ain
- Arrondissement: Belley
- Canton: Belley

Government
  - Mayor (2020–2026): Jean-Pierre Ropele
- Area^{1}: 7.63 km^{2} (2.95 sq mi)
- Elevation: 325 m (1,066 ft)
- Highest elevation: 750 m (2,460 ft)
- Lowest elevation: 290 m (950 ft)
- Population (2023): 244
  - Density: 32.0/km^{2} (82.8/sq mi)
- Time zone: UTC+01:00 (CET)
  - Summer (DST): UTC+02:00 (CEST)
- INSEE/Postal code: 01310 /01300
- ^{1} French Land Register data, which excludes lakes, ponds, glaciers > 1 km^{2} (0.386 sq mi or 247 acres) and river estuaries.

Prémeyzel (French pronunciation: [pʁemɛzɛl]) is a commune in the Ain department in eastern France.

== Population ==
Historical population
Year	Pop.	±% p.a.
1968	92	—
1975	86	−0.96%
1982	79	−1.21%
1990	190	+11.59%
1999	242	+2.72%
2007	250	+0.41%
2012	222	−2.35%
2017	248	+2.24%
2023	244	−0.27%
Source: INSEE

The inhabitants of the town are called Prémeyzélans in French.

== See also ==
- Communes of the Ain department
