= Ercé =

Commune in Occitanie, France

- Commune
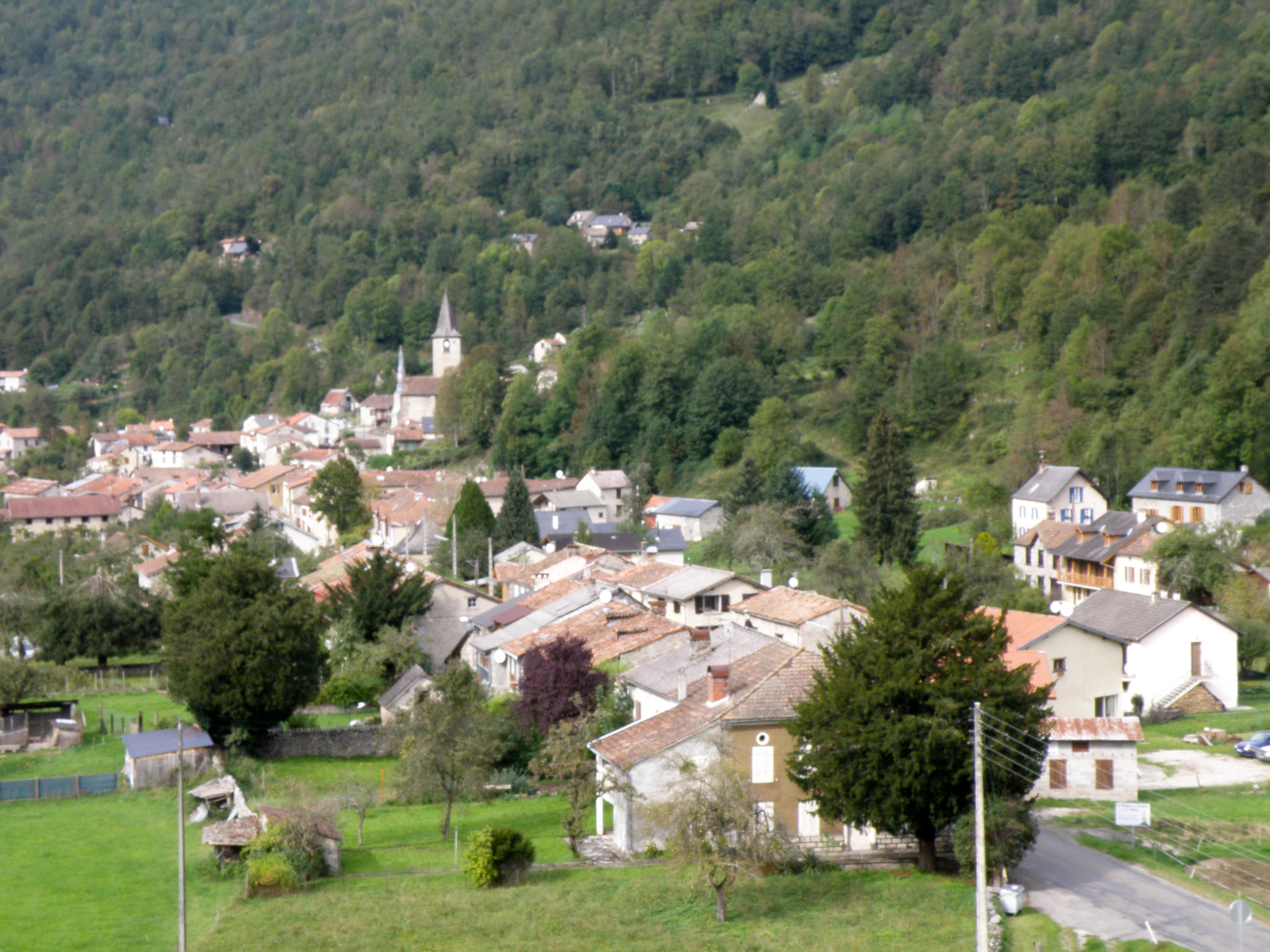
- A general view of Ercé
- Location of Ercé
- Location within France Location within Occitanie
- Coordinates: 42°51′01″N 1°17′25″E
- Country: France
- Region: Occitania
- Department: Ariège
- Arrondissement: Saint-Girons
- Canton: Couserans Est
- Intercommunality: Couserans-Pyrénées

Government
  - Mayor (2020–2026): Christian Carrère
- Area^{1}: 40.75 km^{2} (15.73 sq mi)
- Elevation: 620 m (2,030 ft)
- Highest elevation: 1,905 m (6,250 ft)
- Lowest elevation: 574 m (1,883 ft)
- Population (2023): 602
  - Density: 14.8/km^{2} (38.3/sq mi)
- Time zone: UTC+01:00 (CET)
  - Summer (DST): UTC+02:00 (CEST)
- INSEE/Postal code: 09113 /09140
- ^{1} French Land Register data, which excludes lakes, ponds, glaciers > 1 km^{2} (0.386 sq mi or 247 acres) and river estuaries.

Ercé (French pronunciation: [ɛʁse]; Occitan: Èrce) is a commune in the Ariège department in southwestern France.

== Population ==
Inhabitants are called Ercéens in French.

Historical population
Year	Pop.	±% p.a.
1968	1,012	—
1975	990	−0.31%
1982	750	−3.89%
1990	566	−3.46%
1999	532	−0.69%
2007	539	+0.16%
2012	554	+0.55%
2017	539	−0.55%
2023	602	+1.86%
Source: INSEE

== See also ==
- Communes of the Ariège department
