= Hasbrouck family =

One of the founding families of Ulster County, New York

Hasbrouck
- Current region: United States
- Origin: Calais, France
- Members: Abraham B. Hasbrouck; Abraham J. Hasbrouck; Josiah Hasbrouck; Louis Hasbrouck; Lydia Sayer Hasbrouck; Sol Hasbrouck; William C. Hasbrouck; Jay LeFevre; William Lounsbery; George H. Sharpe; Henry G. Sharpe; John Hasbrouck Van Vleck; Ziggy Hasbrook; Ezra Fitch; Olive Hasbrouck; Laurence H. Snyder; Cleve Benedict; Fred Upton; Daniel O'Day; Kate Upton
- Estates: Stow-Hasbrouck House; Maj. Jacob Hasbrouck Jr. House; Jean Hasbrouck House; Washington's Headquarters State Historic Site; Hasbrouck House (Poughkeepsie, New York)

The Hasbrouck family was an early immigrant family to Ulster County, New York, and helped found New Paltz, New York. The Hasbrouck family were French Huguenots who fled persecution in France by moving to Germany, and then the United States. Two brothers, Jean II and Abraham, are the ancestors of almost all individuals in the United States with the last name "Hasbrouck," or some variation.

== History ==
The Hasbrouck brothers Jean and Abraham were the sons of Jean Hasbrouck I and his wife Esther, both born in France. When Louis XIV gained the French throne in 1643, he aggressively forced Huguenots to convert to Roman Catholicism, an ongoing effort by French monarchs to perform this action. Louis imposed penalties, closed schools, and implemented Dragonnades, which were meant to intimidate the Huguenot families. Huguenot homes would be occupied or looted by French troops as part of this policy.

=== Move to Germany and the Colonies ===
Many of the Huguenots became religious refugees, fleeing France to other parts of Europe. The Hasbrouck family ended up in Mannheim, Germany, among many other families. It wasn't long before these families continued their journey and sailed to the colonies in North America. One of the earliest French Huguenots to move to the colonies was Matthys Blanchan and his family, which included his son-in-law Louis DuBois.

Jean Hasbrouck II and his wife, Anne Deyo, and two of their children, Maria and Hester, along with Anne's parents Christian and Jeanne Verbeau Deyo, and Anne's siblings Pierre, Maria and Elizabeth, would move to present-day New York, settling first in Hurley, New York. In 1675, Jean's brother Abraham would join with the group in Hurley, which had now grown to a very large number. On November 17, 1675, he would marry Maria Deyo, his brother's wife's sister.

=== Founding of New Paltz ===
After garnering enough support and continuing to grow their families, the Huguenots set out to find a desirable land that they could call their own. They found an area 15 miles south of Kingston, New York, where they had resided for a short time but found that the constant squabbles with local Native Americans made it difficult to function. The owners of the land they coveted were the Esopus Indians, who lived on a considerable amount of land up and down the Hudson River where present-day Esopus, New York, runs, through Ulster Park, New York, and into where New Paltz stands.

The Huguenots initiated peaceful negotiations with the Esopus tribe, agreeing to a land contract with five of their chiefs and 21 of their natives. This was followed by the royal, or patent, grant, given to the Huguenots by Governor Edmund Andros on September 29, 1677.

In 1678, the families proceeded to their new home, building simple wood houses near the Wallkill River. They would name their new settlement New Paltz, which was meant to honor the Germany state in which Mannheim exists, Pfalz-am-Rhein. As part of the patent they had received, twelve of the new settlers signed the document and were considered the founders, or patentees, of New Paltz. Jean and Abraham Hasbrouck were two of these signers, along with their father-in-law, Christian Deyo; their brother-in-law, Pierre "Peter" Deyo; brother-in-law, Simon LeFevre (who married Elizabeth Deyo); brother-in-law, Abraham DuBois (who married Margaret Deyo); Jean's son-in-law Isaac DuBois (married Maria Hasbrouck); Abraham and Isaac's father Louis; Simon's brother, Andries LeFevre; Hugo Freer; Louis Bevier; and Antoine Crispell, who married Maria Blanchan, daughter of Matthys and sister of Catherine (married Louis DuBois).

One of the first structures in New Paltz was a fort-like stockade, a requirement of Governor Andros for protection.

=== Huguenot Street ===
(see Huguenot Street Historic District) The families settled on a stretch of land, now known as Historic Huguenot Street, where many of their early homes were built. The wood-like homes were soon replaced by stone structures, that have stood until present day. The first patentee to pass away was Christian Deyo, and a cemetery was established on Huguenot Street not far from where the homes were. Many of the patentees would be buried in this cemetery, and Christian was the first.

Anne Deyo Hasbrouck would die in 1694, and not see many of the structures built with stone; her husband, Jean, died in 1714, having built a small, simple stone house. His brother Abraham would die in 1717, also having built a small house, and his wife Maria Deyo Hasbrouck in 1741. They would all be buried in the Huguenot Cemetery.

Abraham and Maria's son, Daniel, would add on to his father's residence, making it much larger and committing to upgrades for his family. While it was originally thought that the "Abraham Hasbrouck House" was built solely by Abraham, dating of the trees and remnants of the earliest parts of the house show that it was completed after Abraham's death, around 1720. This makes Daniel the likely contributor to most of what the home looks like today, and he resided there until around 1740.

Early Hasbrouck family: Jean and Anna Deyo Hasbrouck had at least six children:

1. Maria Hasbrouck (1664–1719); married Isaac DuBois (1659–1690) on June 1, 1683
2. Hester Hasbrouck (1668–1721); married Pierre "Peter" Gumaer (1666–1729) on April 18, 1692
3. Abraham Hasbrouck (b. 1678)
4. Isaac Hasbrouck (b. 1681)
5. Elizabeth Hasbrouck (1685–1760); married Louis Bevier Jr. (1684–1735) on June 2, 1713
6. Jacob Hasbrouck (1688–1761); married Esther Bevier (1687–1741) on December 7, 1714

Abraham and Maria Deyo Hasbrouck had at least five children:

1. Rachel Hasbrouck (1680-bef 1717); married Louis DuBois Jr. (1677–1749) on January 19, 1701
2. Joseph Hasbrouck (1683–1724); married Elsie Schoonmaker (1685–1764) on October 27, 1705
3. Solomon Hasbrouck (1686–1752); married Sarah Van Wagenen (1701–1753)
4. Daniel Hasbrouck (1692–1759); married Wyntje Deyo (1706–1787); great-granddaughter of Christian Deyo and Daniel's 1st cousin once removed
5. Benjamin Hasbrouck (1696–1763); married Jannetje DeLong (1712–1787) on February 13, 1737
6. Benjamin Hasbrouck (1696–1763); married Jannetje DeLong (1712–1787) on February 13, 1737

Many of the Hasbrouck descendants would marry into the other patentee families, as well as other early settler families from the Netherlands such as the Elting, Van Wagenen, Louw and Schoonmaker families.

== Notable members ==
Coat of Arms of Abraham Hasbrouck

=== Abraham Bruyn Hasbrouck ===
Abraham Bruyn Hasbrouck was born November 29, 1791, in Kingston, New York, the son of Jonathan Hasbrouck, who served as the Ulster County Judge from 1798 to 1799, and his wife, Catharina Wynkoop Hasbrouck. He graduated from Yale University in 1810 and returned to Kingston, where he studied law and opened his practice. In 1824, he was elected to the 19th United States Congress, serving from 1825 to 1827. He was named President of the National Ulster County Bank in Kingston, holding this position until 1840, when he was appointed the 6th President of Rutgers University. He remained in this role until 1850. He died February 23, 1879, in Kingston, and was buried in Houghtaling Cemetery in that city. The cemetery is now defunct.

Abruyn Street in Kingston is named after Abraham Bruyn Hasbrouck; because he was prominent at in Kingston at the same time as his first cousin, Abraham J. Hasbrouck, he would sign his name "Abruyn," thus resulting in the street name. Hasbrouck also founded the village of St. Remy, within the limits of Kingston and Esopus.

- Jean Hasbrouck m. Esther ?
  - Abraham Hasbrouck (1650–1717) m. Maria Deyo (1653–1741)
    - Joseph Hasbrouck (1683–1724) m. Elsie Schoonmaker (1685–1764)
      - Abraham Hasbrouck (1707–1791) m. Catherine Bruyn (1720–1793)
        - Jonathan Hasbrouck (1763–1846) m. Catharina Wynkoop (1763–1846)
          - Abraham Bruyn Hasbrouck

He was married to Julia Frances Ludlum (1796–1869) and was the father-in-law of George H. Sharpe.

=== Abraham Joseph Hasbrouck ===
Abraham J. Hasbrouck was born October 16, 1773, in Libertyville, New York, a small established community outside of New Paltz and Gardiner, New York. He was a descendant of both Abraham and Jean, through multiple lines:

- Jean Hasbrouck m. Esther ?
  - Jean Hasbrouck II (1640–1714) m. Anne Deyo (1644–1694)
    - Maria Hasbrouck (1664–1719) m. Isaac DuBois (1659–1690)
      - Philip DuBois (1689–1764) m. Esther Gumaer (1697–1761)
        - Hester DuBois (1718–1790) m. Louis Bevier III (1717–1772)
          - Elizabeth Bevier (1749–1795) m. Joseph Hasbrouck (1743–1808)
            - Abraham Joseph Hasbrouck
    - Hester Hasbrouck (1668–1721) m. Pierre Gumaer (1666–1729)
      - Esther Gumaer (1697–1761) m. Philip DuBois (1689–1764)
        - Hester DuBois (1718–1790) m. Louis Bevier III (1717–1772)
          - Elizabeth Bevier (1749–1795) m. Joseph Hasbrouck (1743–1808)
            - Abraham Joseph Hasbrouck
    - Elizabeth Hasbrouck (1685–1760) m. Louis Bevier Jr. (1684–1735)
      - Louis Bevier III (1717–1772) m. Hester DuBois (1718–1790)
        - Elizabeth Bevier (1749–1795) m. Joseph Hasbrouck (1743–1808)
          - Abraham Joseph Hasbrouck
  - Abraham Hasbrouck (1650–1717) m. Maria Deyo (1653–1741)
    - Joseph Hasbrouck (1683–1724) m. Elsie Schoonmaker (1685–1764)
      - Abraham Hasbrouck (1707–1791) m. Catherine Bruyn (1720–1793)
        - Joseph Hasbrouck (1743–1808) m. Elizabeth Bevier (1749–1795)
          - Abraham Joseph Hasbrouck

Abraham was a merchant in Kingston, New York, who owned a large property within the Rondout-West Strand Historic District. He served in the New York State Assembly in 1811 and New York State Senate in 1822. In 1812, he was elected to the 13th United States Congress as a Democratic-Republican, serving from 1813 to 1815. He died January 12, 1845, in Kingston, and is buried in the historic Sharp Burial Ground (Albany Avenue Cemetery). Hasbrouck Avenue, Hasbrouck Place, and Hasbrouck Park, all in Kingston, are named for him.

=== Josiah Hasbrouck ===
Josiah Hasbrouck was born March 5, 1755, in New Paltz, the son of Jacob Hasbrouck Jr. and his wife, Jannetje DuBois Hasbrouck. His father served as a major in the American Revolutionary War and as the town supervisor of New Paltz (1762–1765, 1771–1776). Josiah would serve as supervisor of New Paltz as well, from 1784 to 1786, 1793 to 1794, and 1799 to 1805. In between his second and third terms, he served in the New York State Assembly from 1796 to 1797, and again in 1802 and 1806.

In 1802, Hasbrouck was elected to the 8th United States Congress to fill the resignation of John Cantine, serving from 1803 to 1805; he was elected to the 15th United States Congress in 1816, serving from 1817 to 1819.

In 1814, Hasbrouck finished building and began residing in his home, Locust Lawn Estate, which today is a historic site in Gardiner, New York. He lived here until his death in Plattekill on March 19, 1821. He was buried in New Paltz Rural Cemetery.

He married Sarah Decker on February 11, 1785. She was a cousin through the DuBois family.

- Jean Hasbrouck m. Esther ?
  - Jean Hasbrouck II (1640–1714) m. Anne Deyo (1644–1694)
    - Jacob Hasbrouck (1688–1761) m. Esther Bevier (1687–1741)
      - Jacob Hasbrouck Jr. (1727–1806) m. Jannetje DuBois (1731–1807)
        - Josiah Hasbrouck (1755–1821)

=== Louis Hasbrouck ===
Louis Hasbrouck was born April 22, 1777, in New Paltz, son of Joseph and Elizabeth Bevier Hasbrouck, and brother of Abraham J. Hasbrouck. He graduated from Princeton University in 1797, and moved to St. Lawrence County, New York. He served as that county's clerk from 1802 to 1811 and 1813 to 1817. He also served in the New York State Assembly in 1814, New York State Senate from 1833 to 1834, and as the Ogdensburg, New York, postmaster from 1807 to 1830. He died in Ogdensburg on August 20, 1834, and he is buried in the Ogdensburg Cemetery in that locale.

He married Catherine Banks on December 29, 1802, and had at least six children.

- Jean Hasbrouck m. Esther ?
  - Jean Hasbrouck II (1640–1714) m. Anne Deyo (1644–1694)
    - Maria Hasbrouck (1664–1719) m. Isaac DuBois (1659–1690)
      - Philip DuBois (1689–1764) m. Esther Gumaer (1697–1761)
        - Hester DuBois (1718–1790) m. Louis Bevier III (1717–1772)
          - Elizabeth Bevier (1749–1795) m. Joseph Hasbrouck (1743–1808)
            - Louis Hasbrouck
    - Hester Hasbrouck (1668–1721) m. Pierre Gumaer (1666–1729)
      - Esther Gumaer (1697–1761) m. Philip DuBois (1689–1764)
        - Hester DuBois (1718–1790) m. Louis Bevier III (1717–1772)
          - Elizabeth Bevier (1749–1795) m. Joseph Hasbrouck (1743–1808)
            - Louis Hasbrouck
    - Elizabeth Hasbrouck (1685–1760) m. Louis Bevier Jr. (1684–1735)
      - Louis Bevier III (1717–1772) m. Hester DuBois (1718–1790)
        - Elizabeth Bevier (1749–1795) m. Joseph Hasbrouck (1743–1808)
          - Louis Hasbrouck
  - Abraham Hasbrouck (1650–1717) m. Maria Deyo (1653–1741)
    - Joseph Hasbrouck (1683–1724) m. Elsie Schoonmaker (1685–1764)
      - Abraham Hasbrouck (1707–1791) m. Catherine Bruyn (1720–1793)
        - Joseph Hasbrouck (1743–1808) m. Elizabeth Bevier (1749–1795)
          - Louis Hasbrouck

=== Sol Hasbrouck ===
Sol Hasbrouck was born Solomon Hasbrouck on May 30, 1833, in New Paltz, the son of Alexander and Rachel Elting Hasbrouck. He married Anne Eliza Van Wagenen on August 22, 1867, in New Paltz, and shortly thereafter moved out west to Boise, Idaho. They had four children during their time in Idaho, and in 1885, Sol was elected as mayor of Boise. However, after four months, he resigned his position. He died on September 7, 1906, in Boise, and is buried in the Pioneer Cemetery in that city. His wife died February 1, 1907, in Boise and is buried alongside him. Their granddaughter was actress Olive Hasbrouck.

- Jean Hasbrouck m. Esther ?
  - Abraham Hasbrouck (1650–1717) m. Maria Deyo (1653–1741)
    - Solomon Hasbrouck (1686–1752) m. Sarah Van Wagenen (1701–1753)
      - Petrus Hasbrouck (1738–1799) m. Sarah Bevier (b. 1744)
        - Solomon Petrus Hasbrouck (1784–1841) m. Magdalene LeFevre (1789–1841)
          - Alexander Hasbrouck (1809–1895) m. Rachel Elting (1813–1839)
            - Solomon "Sol" Hasbrouck

=== William C. Hasbrouck ===
William Cornelius Hasbrouck was born August 23, 1800, in Shawangunk, New York, the son of Cornelius Benjamin (1769–1841) and Jane Kelso Hasbrouck (1774–1836). He grew up in Ulster County and graduated from Union College in Schenectady, New York. He moved south to Franklin, Tennessee, for a time before moving back north and practicing law. He was a trustee of Newburgh, New York, from 1835 to 1839. He was elected and served in the New York State Assembly in 1847, also serving as the Speaker for this year. After serving, he joined James Taylor and they formed Hasbrouck & Taylor Law Firm in Newburgh. He died on November 5, 1870, in Newburgh, and was buried there in St. George's Cemetery.

On June 28, 1831, William married Mary Elizabeth Roe (1809–1907). She was a descendant of the Elting family. Her brother, William James Roe, was the father of William James Roe. Roe was an apprentice of William in his law firm at one time. William and Mary had nine children.

- Jean Hasbrouck m. Esther ?
  - Abraham Hasbrouck (1650–1717) m. Maria Deyo (1653–1741)
    - Joseph Hasbrouck (1683–1724) m. Elsie Schoonmaker (1685–1764)
      - Benjamin Hasbrouck (1719–1797) m. Lydia Schoonmaker (1729–1809)
        - Cornelius Benjamin Hasbrouck (1769–1841) m. Jane Kelso (1774–1836)
          - William Cornelius Hasbrouck

=== Olive Hasbrouck ===
Olive Elizabeth Hasbrouck was born January 23, 1907, in Lewiston, Idaho, to Van Wagenen Hasbrouck (1876–1918) and his wife, Ladie Larguerite Pingree Hasbrouck. Olive was a film actress of the silent era, appearing in movies from 1924 through 1929. Olive died on January 1, 1976, in La Jolla, California.

Olive was married to philanthropist Nelson Paul Whittier (1904–1991), the son of businessman Max Whittier, and together they had two children: Laddia Ann Whittier Angelin (b. 1932) and Peter Paul Whittier (1934–2010).

- Jean Hasbrouck m. Esther ?
  - Abraham Hasbrouck (1650–1717) m. Maria Deyo (1653–1741)
    - Solomon Hasbrouck (1686–1752) m. Sarah Van Wagenen (1701–1753)
      - Petrus Hasbrouck (1738–1799) m. Sarah Bevier (b. 1744)
        - Solomon Petrus Hasbrouck (1784–1841) m. Magdalene LeFevre (1789–1841)
          - Alexander Hasbrouck (1809–1895) m. Rachel Elting (1813–1839)
            - Solomon "Sol" Hasbrouck (1833–1906) m. Anne Eliza Van Wagenen (1837–1907)
              - Van Wagenen Hasbrouck (1876–1918) m. Ladie Larguerite Pingree (1884–1966)
                - Olive Elizabeth Hasbrouck
    - Rachel Hasbrouck (b. 1680) m. Louis DuBois Jr. (1677–1749)
      - Jonathan DuBois (1710–1746) m. Elizabeth LeFevre (1712–1749)
        - Louis Jonathan DuBois (1733–1813) m. Catrina Brodhead (1738–1795)
          - Jonathan DuBois (1763–1832) m. Rachel Goetschius (1766–1838)
            - Catharine DuBois (1795–1856) m. Benjamin Van Wagenen (1796–1848)
              - Anne Eliza Van Wagenen (1837–1907) m. Solomon "Sol" Hasbrouck (1833–1906)
                - Van Wagenen Hasbrouck (1876–1918) m. Ladie Larguerite Pingree (1884–1966)
                  - Olive Elizabeth Hasbrouck
      - Catharine DuBois (1714–1774) m. Wessel Brodhead (1703–1774)
        - Catrina Brodhead (1738–1795) m. Louis Jonathan DuBois (1733–1813)
          - Jonathan DuBois (1763–1832) m. Rachel Goetschius (1766–1838)
            - Catharine DuBois (1795–1856) m. Benjamin Van Wagenen (1796–1848)
              - Anne Eliza Van Wagenen (1837–1907) m. Solomon "Sol" Hasbrouck (1833–1906)
                - Van Wagenen Hasbrouck (1876–1918) m. Ladie Larguerite Pingree (1884–1966)
                  - Olive Elizabeth Hasbrouck

=== Ziggy Hasbrook ===
Ziggy Hasbrook was born Robert Lyndon Hasbrouck on November 21, 1893, in Grundy Center, Iowa, the son of Leander Pelton Hasbrouck and Josephine Sarah Klein Hasbrouck. He grew up in Iowa, residing in Palermo at the time of the 1900 and 1910 US Census.

In 1913, Ziggy joined the Muscatine Wallopers, playing with them through 1915 (known as the Buttonmakers in 1914 and Muskies in 1915). In 1916, Ziggy appeared in nine games for the Chicago White Sox of Major League Baseball, receiving nine at bats and hitting a single and scoring a run in those opportunities. He played first base for Chicago. He would later re-join the Muskies that year.

In 1917, he appeared in two games for the White Sox, receiving one at bat and playing second base. This would be the end of his Major League career. He would join the Columbus Senators for the rest of 1917, and then played for the Mobile Bears in 1918, Des Moines Boosters in 1919 and 1920, and the San Francisco Seals in 1920.

After his baseball career concluded, Ziggy would stay in Iowa for most of his life, residing in Palermo in 1920, Cedar Rapids in 1930, and Sioux City in 1940. He died on February 9, 1976, in Garland, Texas, and is buried in Restland Memorial Park in Dallas, Texas.

- Jean Hasbrouck m. Esther ?
  - Abraham Hasbrouck (1650–1717) m. Maria Deyo (1653–1741)
    - Solomon Hasbrouck (1686–1752) m. Sarah Van Wagenen (1701–1753)
      - Elias Hasbrouck (1740–1791) m. Elizabeth Slecht (1737–1807)
        - Daniel Elias Hasbrouck (1773–1846) m. Phebe Griffin (1778–1826)
          - Isaac Halstead Hasbrouck (1818–1901) m. Alma Caroline Bonesteel (1820–1895)
            - Leander Pelton Hasbrouck (1845–1930) m. Josephine Sarah Klein (1856–1950)
              - Ziggy Hasbrook

=== Lydia Sayer Hasbrouck ===
Lydia Sayer Hasbrouck was born December 20, 1827, in Bellvale, New York, the daughter of Benjamin Sayer (1791–1874) and his wife, Rebecca Forshee Sayer (1796–1858).

Lydia would move to Middletown, and began wearing Bloomers, which was considered a "radical" article of clothing at that time. She attended school at Elmira Academy and was graduated from Hygeio-Therapeutic College in New York City, studying hydropathy. She would move to Washington, D.C., and became a newspaper correspondent.

John Whitbeck Hasbrouck, of Middletown, invited Lydia to speak as part of a lecture. They would later marry on July 27, 1856. They had three children: Daisy (1857–1860), Sayer (1860–1919), and Burt (1862–1911). She was elected to the Middletown Board of Education in 1880. She would die on August 24, 1910, in Middletown, and was buried in Warwick Cemetery in Warwick, New York.

Hasbrouck Street in Middletown is named after Lydia and John.

- Jean Hasbrouck m. Esther ?
  - Abraham Hasbrouck (1650–1717) m. Maria Deyo (1653–1741)
    - Solomon Hasbrouck (1686–1752) m. Sarah Van Wagenen (1701–1753)
      - Elias Hasbrouck (1740–1791) m. Elizabeth Slecht (1737–1807)
        - Richard Montgomery Hasbrouck (1776–1860) m. Maria Johnson (1782–1853)
          - John Whitbeck Hasbrouck (1821–1906) m. Lydia Sayer

=== Ezra Fitch ===
Ezra Hasbrouck Fitch was born September 21, 1865, in Coxsackie, New York, to Roswell Reed Fitch and his wife, Margaretta Wyanna Hasbrouck Fitch. Ezra was only 15 days old when his mother died on October 6, 1865, likely due to complications of his birth. His parents had married on December 21, 1864, in Stone Ridge, New York. On July 17, 1873, Roswell married Helen Eldridge Carswell (1847–1950), and they had two daughters: Helen Margaret Fitch Cobb (1874–1978) and Eloise Maddren Fitch (1880–1902). Ezra's paternal aunt, Harriet Fitch (1840–1932), married his maternal uncle, John Cornelius Hasbrouck (1840–1901), and they had seven children, making them double first cousins of Ezra.

Ezra grew up on the Hudson River in Coxsackie on an estate built by his paternal great-grandfather, Roswell Reed. His father would move the family to Brooklyn, and would die there on January 11, 1888. By this time, Ezra had been out on his own, having graduated from New York University in 1894 and engaging in different business pursuits and becoming a significant customer of David Abercrombie's store, Abercrombie Co., starting in 1892.

On March 2, 1897, in Brooklyn, Ezra married Sara Huntington Sturges (1874–1960), daughter of banker Stephen Buckingham Sturges. They moved to California for a brief period before moving back east. They had a daughter, Edith Sturges Fitch, born in 1901 in New York City. The Fitch's would move to Kingston, New York, where Ezra opened a law practice. He would still frequently travel to New York and visit David Abercrombie's store, and by 1900, he had purchased a large share of the business. By 1904, they would become known as "Abercrombie and Fitch Co." Ezra wished for the company to become increasingly more public, while David did not wish for this to happen, instead wanting to keep it for the elite. Abercrombie sold out to Fitch in 1907, and with that, Ezra Fitch expanded the company with large success. He would remain in charge until 1928, when he sold his assets in the company, which is still known today as Abercrombie & Fitch.

Ezra Fitch was attributed to bringing Mahjong to the United States from China.

Ezra H. Fitch died on June 16, 1930, off the coast of Santa Barbara, California, on his yacht. He had only owned and slept on the yacht for a few days leading up to his death. He was buried in Washington on the Green Cemetery in Washington, Connecticut. His daughter, Edith, married Paul Fessenden Cruikshank and they had four children: Paul Fessenden, Jr., Elaine, Sally and Janet. His half-sister Helen's son, Roswell Fitch Truman, would remain a part of Abercrombie and Fitch for quite some time after Ezra's death.

Fitch street in Kingston, New York, is named for Ezra and his paternal grandfather, Ezra Fitch (1805–1870).

- Jean Hasbrouck m. Esther ?
  - Jean Hasbrouck (1640–1714) m. Anne Deyo (1644–1694)
    - Jacob Hasbrouck (1688–1761) m. Esther Bevier (1687–1741)
      - Isaac Hasbrouck (1722–1789) m. Maria Bruyn (1723–1776)
        - Lewis Hasbrouck (1767–1834) m. Catharine Decker (1774–1828)
          - Benjamin Louis Hasbrouck (1813–1885) m. Margaret Rymph (1812–1880)
            - Margaretta Wyanna Hasbrouck (1846–1865) m. Roswell Reed Fitch (1841–1888)
              - Ezra Hasbrouck Fitch
  - Abraham Hasbrouck (1650–1717) m. Maria Deyo (1653–1741)
    - Daniel Hasbrouck (1692–1759) m. Wyntje Deyo (1706–1787)
      - David Hasbrouck (1740–1806) m. Maria Hoogland (1746–1825)
        - Weyntje Hasbrouck (1787–1858) m. John Rymph (1771–1841)
          - Margaret Rymph (1812–1880) m. Benjamin Louis Hasbrouck (1813–1885)
            - Margaretta Wyanna Hasbrouck (1846–1865) m. Roswell Reed Fitch (1841–1888)
              - Ezra Hasbrouck Fitch

=== Jay LeFevre ===
Jay LeFevre was born September 6, 1893, in New Paltz, the son of Abraham Philip "Abram" LeFevre and his wife, Mary Emma Vanderlyn LeFevre. Through his mother, he was a distant relative of painter John Vanderlyn.

Jay graduated from Dartmouth College in 1916, and then joined the United States Army and served as a second lieutenant in the Reserve Officers Training Corps at Camp Taylor, Arkansas. He was associated with his father in business involving coal and lumber in the New Paltz area, and engaged in banking in that locale as well. His father had been Supervisor of the Town of New Paltz from 1910 to 1913, and served in the New York State Assembly from 1914 to 1917.

In 1942, Jay was elected to the 78th United States Congress as a Republican from New York's 27th Congressional District. He served from 1943 to 1945, getting re-elected and serving from 1945 to 1951 as a member from New York's 30th Congressional District. He was not a candidate for re-election in 1950, and joined the New York State Bridge Authority. By this point, he was also not engaged in his father's former business pursuits, either.

Jay died on April 26, 1970, in Kingston, New York. He was buried in the Lloyd Union Cemetery in Lloyd, New York. He married Mildred B. Hiltebrant (1893–1984) on January 3, 1920, and had three children: Elaine (1921–2004), Jay Abram (1925–2014) and John Hiltebrant (1927–2006).

- Jean Hasbrouck m. Esther ?
  - Jean Hasbrouck (1640–1714) m. Anne Deyo (1644–1694)
    - Maria Hasbrouck (1664–1719) m. Isaac DuBois (1659–1690)
      - Daniel DuBois (1684–1752) m. Marytjen LeFevre (1689–1730)
        - Elizabeth DuBois (1714–1792) m. Abraham Deyo Jr. (1710–1777)
          - Maria DuBois (1748–1817) m. Nathaniel LeFevre (1749–1817)
            - Jacobus LeFevre (1789–1840) m. Elizabeth Jansen (1789–1862)
              - Blandina LeFevre (1812–1875) m. Roelif Elting (1809–1884)
                - Sarah Elting (1836–1879) m. Solomon LeFevre (1833–1902)
                  - Abraham Philip LeFevre (1865–1929) m. Mary Emma Vanderlyn (1867–1946)
                    - Jay LeFevre
  - Abraham Hasbrouck (1650–1717) m. Maria Deyo (1653–1741)
    - Rachel Hasbrouck (b. 1680) m. Louis DuBois Jr. (1677–1749)
      - Nathaniel DuBois (1703–1763) m. Geertruy Bruyn (b. 1709)
        - Rachel DuBois (1727–1781) m. Andries LeFevre (1722–1812)
          - Nathaniel LeFevre (1749–1817) m. Maria Deyo (1748–1817)
            - Jacobus LeFevre (1789–1840) m. Elizabeth Jansen (1789–1862)
              - Blandina LeFevre (1812–1875) m. Roelif Elting (1809–1884)
                - Sarah Elting (1836–1879) m. Solomon LeFevre (1833–1902)
                  - Abraham Philip LeFevre (1865–1929) m. Mary Emma Vanderlyn (1867–1946)
          - Sarah LeFevre (1768–1823) m. Josiah Elting (1762–1834)
            - Roelif Elting (1809–1884) m. Blandina LeFevre (1812–1875)
              - Sarah Elting (1836–1879) m. Solomon LeFevre (1833–1902)
                - Abraham Philip LeFevre (1865–1929) m. Mary Emma Vanderlyn (1867–1946)
                  - Jay LeFevre
      - Jonathan DuBois (1710–1746) m. Elizabeth LeFevre (1712–1749)
        - Andries DuBois (b. 1737) m. Sarah LeFevre (b. 1736)
          - Elsje DuBois (1771–1843) m. Philip LeFevre (1763–1840)
            - Abraham LeFevre (1792–1879) m. Margrietje Jansen (1795–1843)
              - Solomon LeFevre (1833–1902) m. Sarah Elting (1836–1879)
                - Abraham Philip LeFevre (1865–1929) m. Mary Emma Vanderlyn (1867–1946)
                  - Jay LeFevre
    - Joseph Hasbrouck (1683–1724) m. Elsie Schoonmaker (1685–1764)
      - Petronella Hasbrouck (b. 1710) m. Simon LeFever (1709–1743)
        - Sarah LeFevre (b. 1736) m. Andries DuBois (b. 1737)
          - Elsje DuBois (1771–1843) m. Philip LeFevre (1763–1840)
            - Abraham LeFevre (1792–1879) m. Margrietje Jansen (1795–1843)
              - Solomon LeFevre (1833–1902) m. Sarah Elting (1836–1879)
                - Abraham Philip LeFevre (1865–1929) m. Mary Emma Vanderlyn (1867–1946)
                  - Jay LeFevre

=== William Lounsbery ===
William Lounsbery was born December 25, 1831, in Stone Ridge, New York, the son of John and Sarah Peters Lounsbery. His father was Postmaster of Stone Ridge from 1831 to 1839, 1844 to 1849 and 1858 to 1860.

William graduated from Rutgers University in New Brunswick, New Jersey, in 1851. In 1853, he engaged in the practice of law in Kingston, New York. During the Civil War he served as commissary of the Twentieth Regiment as a first lieutenant.

In 1867, he was elected to the New York State Assembly, serving one year in 1868. In 1877, he was elected the second mayor of Kingston, serving from 1878 to 1879, when he was elected to the 46th United States Congress as a Democrat, serving from 1879 to 1881.

William died on November 8, 1905, in Kingston, and was buried in that city in Wiltwyck Rural Cemetery. Lounsbery Place in Kingston is named for him.

William married firstly, on September 8, 1858, Catharine Elizabeth Eaman, daughter of John and Harriet DuBois Eaman and descendant of Louis DuBois. She died on May 1, 1889. On January 12, 1891, he married Alice Van Buren. She died on August 10, 1939. He had a daughter with his first wife, Katharine DuBois Lounsbery McKnight (1860–1941), and a daughter with his second wife, Elizabeth Adeline Lounsbery Gleason (1893–1995).

- Jean Hasbrouck m. Esther ?
  - Jean Hasbrouck II (1640–1714) m. Anne Deyo (1644–1694)
    - Jacob Hasbrouck (1688–1761) m. Esther Bevier (1687–1741)
      - Isaac Hasbrouck (1722–1789) m. Maria Bruyn (1723–1776)
        - Jacob Hasbrouck (1746–1838) m. Sara DuBois (1747–1821)
          - Margaret Hasbrouck (1773–1847) m. William Peters (1773–1814)
            - Sarah Peters (1796–1866) m. John Lounsbery (1803–1864)
              - William Lounsbery

=== George H. Sharpe ===
George Henry Sharpe was born February 26, 1828, in Kingston, to Henry and Helen Hasbrouck Sharpe, and grandson of Abraham J. Hasbrouck. He grew up in Kingston and attended Kingston Academy and Albany Academy before entering Rutgers University, graduating from that institute in 1847. He entered private law practice in New York City, engaging from 1848 to 1851, and then moving to Kingston and practicing law there from 1854 to 1861.

At the outbreak of the American Civil War, Sharpe had been captain of the 20th New York Militia, but had submitted his resignation. However, at word of the attack on Fort Sumter, Sharpe withdrew his resignation and had recruited 248 men through one day. In 1862, he was commissioned a colonel and over a span of 22 days recruited 1041 men, going to battle on the 23rd day. He was brevetted to brigadier general in 1864 and major general in 1865.

Following the Civil War, Major General Sharpe was sent to Europe to identify United States citizens that may have been involved in the assassination of President Abraham Lincoln, making him the "first CIA agent" in U.S. history. This assignment followed a stint as Chief of the Bureau of Military Information from 1863 to 1865.

Sharpe was elected in 1878 to the New York State Assembly, serving from 1879 to 1882, serving as its speaker from 1880 to 1881. Sharpe was nominated to the Board of General Appraisers by President Benjamin Harrison in 1890, serving until his resignation in 1899.

General Sharpe died on January 13, 1900, in Manhattan, New York, at the residence of his daughter and son-in-law.

General Sharpe built a large mansion at 1 Albany Avenue in Kingston after the conclusion of the Civil War, and resided here up until the 1890s. His mansion stood until the 1960s, when it was demolished. General Sharpe entertained many guests at this mansion, including United States Presidents Ulysses S. Grant and Chester A. Arthur. Not far from where his mansion once stood was a cemetery, called Sharp's Burying Ground, at 148 Albany Avenue. This burial ground was likely named for General Sharpe's father as well as himself.

General Sharpe married his cousin, Caroline Hone Hasbrouck (1830–1898), on December 20, 1855. She was the daughter of Abraham Bruyn Hasbrouck and his wife, Julia Ludlum Hasbrouck. Together they had three children:

1. Severyn Bruyn Sharpe (1857–1929), an 1879 graduate of Yale University and one-time Ulster County Judge; he married Frances Payntar (1868–1949) and had one daughter, Katharine Davenport Sharpe (1901–1989)
2. Henry Granville Sharpe (1858–1947), an 1880 graduate of the United States Military Academy at West Point, New York, and 24th Quartermaster General of the United States Army; he married Kate Huntington Morgan (1858–1941)
3. Katherine Lawrence Sharpe (1860–1945), who married United States Senator Ira Davenport Jr. and resided in New York City and Bath, New York, for most of her life
- Jean Hasbrouck m. Esther ?
  - Jean Hasbrouck II (1640–1714) m. Anne Deyo (1644–1694)
    - Maria Hasbrouck (1664–1719) m. Isaac DuBois (1659–1690)
      - Philip DuBois (1689–1764) m. Esther Gumaer (1697–1761)
        - Hester DuBois (1718–1790) m. Louis Bevier III (1717–1772)
          - Elizabeth Bevier (1749–1795) m. Joseph Hasbrouck (1743–1808)
            - Abraham Joseph Hasbrouck (1773–1845) m. Helena Jansen (1770–1824)
              - Helen Hasbrouck (1797–1886) m. Henry Sharpe (1782–1830)
                - George Henry Sharpe
    - Hester Hasbrouck (1668–1721) m. Pierre Gumaer (1666–1729)
      - Esther Gumaer (1697–1761) m. Philip DuBois (1689–1764)
        - Hester DuBois (1718–1790) m. Louis Bevier III (1717–1772)
          - Elizabeth Bevier (1749–1795) m. Joseph Hasbrouck (1743–1808)
            - Abraham Joseph Hasbrouck (1773–1845) m. Helena Jansen (1770–1824)
              - Helen Hasbrouck (1797–1886) m. Henry Sharpe (1782–1830)
                - George Henry Sharpe
    - Elizabeth Hasbrouck (1685–1760) m. Louis Bevier Jr. (1684–1735)
      - Louis Bevier III (1717–1772) m. Hester DuBois (1718–1790)
        - Elizabeth Bevier (1749–1795) m. Joseph Hasbrouck (1743–1808)
          - Abraham Joseph Hasbrouck (1773–1845) m. Helena Jansen (1770–1824)
            - Helen Hasbrouck (1797–1886) m. Henry Sharpe (1782–1830)
              - George Henry Sharpe
  - Abraham Hasbrouck (1650–1717) m. Maria Deyo (1653–1741)
    - Joseph Hasbrouck (1683–1724) m. Elsie Schoonmaker (1685–1764)
      - Abraham Hasbrouck (1707–1791) m. Catherine Bruyn (1720–1793)
        - Joseph Hasbrouck (1743–1808) m. Elizabeth Bevier (1749–1795)
          - Abraham Joseph Hasbrouck (1773–1845) m. Helena Jansen (1770–1824)
            - Helen Hasbrouck (1797–1886) m. Henry Sharpe (1782–1830)
              - George Henry Sharpe

=== Washington Irving Chambers ===
Washington Irving Chambers was born April 4, 1856, in Kingston, to Jacob and Margaret Ann Ayres Chambers. Named after the author Washington Irving, Chambers grew up in Kingston, and graduated from the United States Naval Academy in Annapolis, Maryland in 1876. Following his graduation, Chambers was assigned to multiple ships from 1876 to 1902, working his way up the ranks from Seaman to Ensign to Lieutenant to Lieutenant Commander. He spent 1888-1889 serving as a Lieutenant in the New York Navy Yard.

After 1902, he was promoted to captain, and from 1907-1909, served as the Assistant Chief of the Bureau of Ordnance.

In June 1938, Chambers Field in Norfolk, Virginia was named after him, as was the USNS Washington Chambers (T-AKE-11), placed in service in 2011. Chambers was known as a pioneer in the Naval Aviation Field for the United States.

He married Mary Isabella Reynolds (1863–1945) on December 3, 1892, in Kingston. She went by Isabella or Belle for most of her life. He and his wife are buried in Arlington National Cemetery.

- Jean Hasbrouck m. Esther ?
  - Jean Hasbrouck II (1640–1714) m. Anne Deyo (1644–1694)
    - Jacob Hasbrouck (1688–1761) m. Esther Bevier (1687–1741)
      - Isaac Hasbrouck (1722–1789) m. Maria Bruyn (1723–1776)
        - Benjamin Hasbrouck (1764–1843) m. Catharina Smedes (1768-bef.1802)
          - Mary Ann Hasbrouck (1789–1868) m. Henry Pawling Chambers (1787–1857)
            - Jacob Chambers (1812–1882) m. Margaret Ann Ayres (1817–1903)
              - Washington Irving Chambers
  - Abraham Hasbrouck (1650–1717) m. Maria Deyo (1653–1741)
    - Daniel Hasbrouck (1692–1759) m. Wyntje Deyo (1706–1787)
      - Elsie Hasbrouck (b. 1742) m. Petrus Smedes Jr. (1740–1784)
        - Catharina Smedes (1768-bef.1802) m. Benjamin Hasbrouck (1764–1843)
          - Mary Ann Hasbrouck (1789–1868) m. Henry Pawling Chambers (1787–1857)
            - Jacob Chambers (1812–1882) m. Margaret Ann Ayres (1817–1903)
              - Washington Irving Chambers

=== Laurence Hasbrouck Snyder ===
Laurence Hasbrouck Snyder was born July 23, 1901, in Kingston, son of DeWitt Clinton and Gertrude Louisa Wood Snyder. He had four siblings, Anna Gertrude (died in infancy), Robert, Allan, and Clinton DeWitt. By 1905, the family was residing in Brooklyn, and by 1920 in Staten Island, New York. Laurence graduated from Rutgers University in 1922, and two years later was brought on to be a professor of biology at North Carolina State University in Raleigh, North Carolina. In 1926, while still a professor, he earned a doctor of science degree from Harvard University.

Snyder would remain at NC State until 1930, when he moved and became a professor of genetics at Ohio State University in Columbus, Ohio. He would later become chairman of the Department of Zoology and Entomology at OSU, remaining at this institution until 1947. The 1930 United States Census shows Snyder living in Swift Creek, North Carolina, and the 1940 United States Census shows Snyder living in Columbus, Ohio.

Following his tenure at OSU, Snyder moved once again, becoming dean of the graduate college and professor of medicine at the University of Oklahoma in Norman, Oklahoma. Snyder would serve in these positions until 1958. While at OU, Snyder served as the president of the Genetics Society of America in 1948, president of the American Society of Human Genetics in 1950, and president of the American Association for the Advancement of Science in 1957.

In 1958, Snyder became president of the University of Hawaii in Honolulu. He served in this role until 1963, and while in office he oversaw a very large expansion of the college, in both buildings (37 new built) and enrollment (doubled).

Snyder has been described as a father of human genetics thanks to his long career in the profession and his research. He died on October 8, 1986, in Honolulu.

He married Guldborg M. Herland (1901–1994) in 1923, and they had two daughters: Clara Reed Snyder Converse and Margaret Neal Snyder Petersen. At the time of his death, his obituary states that he had nine grandchildren and 11 great-grandchildren. His ashes were scattered privately by his family.

- Jean Hasbrouck m. Esther ?
  - Jean Hasbrouck II (1640–1714) m. Anne Deyo (1644–1694)
    - Jacob Hasbrouck (1688–1761) m. Esther Bevier (1687–1741)
      - Isaac Hasbrouck (1722–1789) m. Maria Bruyn (1723–1776)
        - Jacob Hasbrouck (1746–1838) m. Sara DuBois (1747–1821)
          - Margaret Hasbrouck (1773–1847) m. William Peters (1773–1814)
            - Maria Peters (1802–1877) m. William DuBois Van Wagenen (1804–1879)
              - Margaret Van Wagenen (1829–1869) m. Benjamin Franklin Snyder (1826–1889)
                - DeWitt Clinton Snyder (1859–1919) m. Gertrude Louisa Wood (1869–1961)
                  - Laurence Hasbrouck Snyder

=== Cleveland Keith Benedict II ===
Cleveland Benedict was born March 21, 1935, in Harrisburg, Pennsylvania, the son of Cooper Procter and Laura DeLamater Benedict. He had two younger siblings, Oakley DeLamater Benedict (1938–1940) and Elizabeth Hasbrouck Benedict Glenn (b. 1941). He attended and graduated from Princeton University in 1957 with an A.B. in history. He would settle in Lewisburg, West Virginia.

He was an unsuccessful candidate for West Virginia State Senate in 1970. He ran for the United States House of Representatives from West Virginia's 2nd district, looking to succeed retiring Congressman Harley O. Staggers. Benedict was successful and served from 1981 to 1983, deciding not to run for re-election due to his desire to run for the United States Senate. He challenged incumbent Robert C. Byrd but was unsuccessful in this campaign. In 1988, he was elected West Virginia's commissioner of their department of agriculture, serving from 1989 to 1993. He ran for governor of West Virginia in 1992 but was unsuccessful in this attempt as well.

On August 10, 1957, he married Ann Farrar Arthur (b. 1933) in Winchester, Virginia. They had three children, including author Pinckney Benedict. Pinckney's son, Cleveland Keith Benedict III, carries on Cleve's name. Through his father, Cleve is a 2nd great-grandson of Procter & Gamble cofounder William Procter.

- Jean Hasbrouck m. Esther ?
  - Abraham Hasbrouck (1650–1717) m. Maria Deyo (1653–1741)
    - Joseph Hasbrouck (1683–1724) m. Elsie Schoonmaker (1685–1764)
      - Abraham Hasbrouck (1707–1791) m. Catherine Bruyn (1720–1793)
        - Joseph Hasbrouck (1743–1808) m. Elizabeth Bevier (1749–1795)
          - David Hasbrouck (1779–1823) m. Abigail Love Lawrence (1789–1865)
            - John Lawrence Hasbrouck (1813–1895) m. Mary C. Tremper (1814–1890)
              - Price Wetherall Hasbrouck (1841–1901) m. Annie Osborn Peirson (1848–1929)
                - Elizabeth Lawrence Hasbrouck (1872-) m. Oakley Ramshon DeLamater (1870–1936)
                  - Laura DeLamater (1911-) m. Cooper Procter Benedict (1907–1968)
                    - Cleveland Keith Benedict (b. 1935)

=== Frederick Stephen Upton ===
Fred Upton was born April 23, 1953, in St. Joseph, Michigan, the son of Stephen Edward and Elizabeth Brooks (Vial) Upton. He was the oldest of five children. He attended and graduated from the University of Michigan in 1975.

He served on the congressional staff of David Stockman before moving over to the Office of Management and Budget under President Ronald Reagan, while Stockman served as that organization's director. Initially elected to represent Michigan's 4th district in 1986, Upton was re-elected in 1988, 1990, 1992, 1994, 1996, and 1998. In 2000, after redistricting, Upton ran for Michigan's 6th congressional district, winning re-election to congress that year, and continuing to do so each election cycle up to 2022. He decided not to run again in 2022.

He married Amey Richmond Rulon-Miller (b. 1956), and they have two children: Meg and Stephen. She is a descendant of Rhode Island Congressman Samuel Eddy.

- Jean Hasbrouck m. Esther ?
  - Jean Hasbrouck II (1640–1714) m. Anne Deyo (1644–1694)
    - Hester Hasbrouck (1668–1712) m. Pierre Guimard (1666–1729)
      - Annatje Gumaer (1694-) m. Jacobus Swartwout (1696–1756)
        - Philippus Gumaer (1727–1778) m. Deborah Schoonover (1741-)
          - Peter Swartwout (1766–1817) m. Jannetje Westfall (1770–1855)
            - James D. Swartwout (1792–1871) m. Naomi Cuddeback (1795–1854)
              - Jane Swartout (1830–1896) m. Jonathan Richard Mather (1821–1907)
                - Carrie Naomi Mather (1866–1939) m. Edward Everett Beckley (1865–1912)
                  - Margaret Rosette Mather Beckley (1895–1975) m. Frederick Stanley Upton (1890–1986)
                    - Stephen Edward Upton (1924–2022) m. Elizabeth Brooks Vial (1929-
                      - Frederick Stephen "Fred" Upton (b. 1953)
      - Pierre Guimar Jr. (1708–1778) m. Tjaatje DeWitt (1710–1756)
        - Esther Guimar (1730–1800) m. Abraham C. Cuddeback (1738–1817)
          - Cornelius Cuddeback (1772–1841) m. Margery Van Auken (1782–1857)
            - Naomi Cuddeback (1795–1854) m. James D. Swartwout (1792–1871)
              - Jane Swartout (1830–1896) m. Jonathan Richard Mather (1821–1907)
                - Carrie Naomi Mather (1866–1939) m. Edward Everett Beckley (1865–1912)
                  - Margaret Rosette Mather Beckley (1895–1975) m. Frederick Stanley Upton (1890–1986)
                    - Stephen Edward Upton (1924–2022) m. Elizabeth Brooks Vial (1929-
                      - Frederick Stephen "Fred" Upton (b. 1953)

=== Darren Christopher O'Day ===
Darren O'Day was born October 22, 1982, in Jacksonville, Florida, the son of Ralph Leon and Michal (Shoemaker) O'Day. He has one older brother, Kyle Matthew O'Day (born 1979). He attended and played baseball at the University of Florida in Gainesville and graduated with a Bachelor's Degree in agricultural and life sciences. Although undrafted out of college, O'Day signed as a free agent with the Los Angeles Angels of Anaheim of Major League Baseball in 2006. On March 31, 2008, O'Day made his major league debut with the Angels.

O'Day is now retired, having played with the New York Mets in 2009; the Texas Rangers from 2009 to 2011; the Baltimore Orioles from 2012 to 2018; the Atlanta Braves from 2019 to 2020 and in 2022; and the New York Yankees in 2021. He was an All-Star in 2015 while a member of the Orioles. In 14 seasons, O'Day was 40–21 with a 2.59 ERA and 637 strikeouts.

- Jean Hasbrouck m. Esther ?
  - Jean Hasbrouck II (1640–1714) m. Anne Deyo (1644–1694)
    - Maria Hasbrouck (1664–1719) m. Isaac DuBois (1659–1690)
      - Daniel DuBois (1684–1752) m. Marytjen LeFevre (1689–1730)
        - Elizabeth DuBois (1714–1792) m. Abraham Deyo (1710–1777)
          - Jonathan Deyo (1745–1823) m. Maria LeFevre (1756–1836)
            - Catharine Deyo (1785–1857) m. Wilhelmus DuBois (1783–1848)
              - Mathusalem DuBois (1811–1858) m. Rachel Malinda Nees (1821–1867)
                - Wilhelmus DuBois (1840–1910) m. Hannah Matilda Holcomb (1836–1922)
                  - William Ross DuBois (1866–1947) m. Avis Idona Briggs (1871–1917)
                    - Leona Matilda DuBois (1895–1973) m. Leo Fletcher Ambler (1893–1990)
                      - Marcia Joann Ambler (1926–1989) m. Herman Roger Shoemaker (1925–2002)
                        - Michal Shoemaker (b. 1949) m. Ralph Leon O'Day (b. 1951)
                          - Darren Christopher O'Day (b. 1982)

=== Kate Upton ===
Katherine Elizabeth Upton was born June 10, 1992, in St. Joseph, Michigan, the daughter of Jefferson Matthew "Jeff" Upton and Shelley Fawn (Davis) Upton. She has three siblings: Christie, David and Laura. She is an American model and actress. She first appeared in the Sports Illustrated Swimsuit Issue in 2011, and was the cover model for the 2012, 2013 and 2017 issues. In addition, she was the subject of the 100th-anniversary Vanity Fair cover. Upton has also appeared in the films Tower Heist (2011), The Other Woman (2014) and The Layover (2017).

She married Major League Baseball player Justin Verlander on November 4, 2017, in Tuscany, Italy. Together they have a daughter, Genevieve Upton Verlander.

- Jean Hasbrouck m. Esther ?
  - Jean Hasbrouck II (1640–1714) m. Anne Deyo (1644–1694)
    - Hester Hasbrouck (1668–1712) m. Pierre Guimard (1666–1729)
      - Annatje Gumaer (1694-) m. Jacobus Swartwout (1696–1756)
        - Philippus Gumaer (1727–1778) m. Deborah Schoonover (1741-)
          - Peter Swartwout (1766–1817) m. Jannetje Westfall (1770–1855)
            - James D. Swartwout (1792–1871) m. Naomi Cuddeback (1795–1854)
              - Jane Swartout (1830–1896) m. Jonathan Richard Mather (1821–1907)
                - Carrie Naomi Mather (1866–1939) m. Edward Everett Beckley (1865–1912)
                  - Margaret Rosette Mather Beckley (1895–1975) m. Frederick Stanley Upton (1890–1986)
                    - Stephen Edward Upton (1924–2022) m. Elizabeth Brooks Vial (b. 1929)
                      - Jefferson Matthew Upton (b. 1961) m. Shelley Fawn Davis (b. 1963)
                        - Kate Upton (b. 1992)
      - Pierre Guimar Jr. (1708–1778) m. Tjaatje DeWitt (1710–1756)
        - Esther Guimar (1730–1800) m. Abraham C. Cuddeback (1738–1817)
          - Cornelius Cuddeback (1772–1841) m. Margery Van Auken (1782–1857)
            - Naomi Cuddeback (1795–1854) m. James D. Swartwout (1792–1871)
              - Jane Swartout (1830–1896) m. Jonathan Richard Mather (1821–1907)
                - Carrie Naomi Mather (1866–1939) m. Edward Everett Beckley (1865–1912)
                  - Margaret Rosette Mather Beckley (1895–1975) m. Frederick Stanley Upton (1890–1986)
                    - Stephen Edward Upton (1924–2022) m. Elizabeth Brooks Vial (b. 1929)
                      - Jefferson Matthew Upton (b. 1961) m. Shelley Fawn Davis (b. 1963)
                        - Kate Upton (b. 1992)

== Local elected leaders ==
Given their early arrival and help in forming a more complete Ulster County, and elsewhere, many Hasbrouck family members and descendants have served in elected or appointed political positions within Ulster County.

- Jean Hasbrouck m. Esther ?
  - Jean Hasbrouck II (1640–1714) m. Anne Deyo (1644–1694)
    - Maria Hasbrouck (1664–1719) m. Isaac DuBois (1659–1690)
      - Daniel DuBois (1684–1752) m. Marytjen LeFevre (1689–1730)
        - Elizabeth DuBois (1714–1792) m. Abraham Deyo Jr. (1710–1777)
          - Abraham Deyo III (1736–1808) m. Maria LeFevre (1756–1793)
            - Abraham A. Deyo (1793–1873) m. Margaret T. Deyo (1792–1860)- Deyo served as the Town of Plattekill supervisor from 1835 to 1839 and 1841-1842, and then served as a New York State Senator from 1843 to 1846
              - Abraham A. Deyo Jr. (1819–1883)- Deyo Jr. served as the Town of Kingston supervisor from 1870 to 1871; he also served as the New Paltz Postmaster from 1845 to 1849 and 1853-1858, as well as Ulster County Sheriff in 1858
          - Daniel Deyo (1740–1823) m. Margaret LeFevre (1743–1796)
            - Abraham Deyo (1763–1805) m. Anne Brodhead (1764–1845)
              - Margaret T. Deyo (1792–1860) m. Abraham A. Deyo (1793–1873)
                - Abraham A. Deyo Jr. (1819–1883)- see above
            - Nathaniel Deyo (1770–1835) m. Lea DeWitt (1773–1813)
              - Jonathan Nathaniel Deyo (1805–1886) m. Maria LeFevre (1816–1905)
                - Andrew LeFevre Deyo (1845–1926)- Deyo served as the Town of Gardiner supervisor in 1873, 1875, and 1885, and from 1887 to 1891; he then served as the Ulster County Treasurer from 1893-1895
          - Simeon Deyo (1743–1819) m. Antje Low (1738–1811)
            - Joseph Deyo (1777–1834) m. Julia Kelsey (1780–1854)
              - Reuben Deyo (1800–1864)- Deyo served as the Town of New Paltz supervisor in 1840 and the Town of Lloyd supervisor from 1845 to 1848
          - Maria Deyo (1748–1817) m. Nathaniel LeFevre (1749–1817)
            - Rachel LeFevre (1778–1831) m. Jonas DuBois (1770–1844)
              - LeFevre DuBois (1801–1881) m. Rebecca DuBois (1807–1876)
                - Garret Louis DuBois (1842–1913) m. Hannah Frances Constable (1850–1901)
                  - Fred DuBois (1881–1950) m. Anna Frances Buchanan (1880–1964)- F. DuBois served as the Town of New Paltz supervisor from 1930 to 1933
                    - Fred Haddon DuBois (1911–2002)- F.H. DuBois served as the Town of New Paltz supervisor from 1955 to 1959 and as Ulster County Treasurer from 1959 to 1977
      - Philip DuBois (1689–1764) m. Esther Gumaer (1697–1761)
        - Hester DuBois (1718–1790) m. Louis Bevier III (1717–1772)
          - Philip DuBois Bevier (1751–1802)- Bevier served as the town of Rochester supervisor from 1794 to 1800
    - Hester Hasbrouck (1668–1721) m. Pierre Gumaer (1666–1729)
      - Esther Gumaer (1697–1761) m. Philip DuBois (1689–1764)
        - Hester DuBois (1718–1790) m. Louis Bevier III (1717–1772)
          - Philip DuBois Bevier (1751–1802)- see above
    - Elizabeth Hasbrouck (1685–1760) m. Louis Bevier Jr. (1684–1735)
      - Louis Bevier III (1717–1772) m. Hester DuBois (1718–1790)
        - Philip DuBois Bevier (1751–1802)- see above
    - Jacob Hasbrouck (1688–1761) m. Esther Bevier (1687–1741)
      - Isaac Hasbrouck (1722–1789) m. Maria Bruyn (1723–1776)
        - Jacob Hasbrouck (1746–1838) m. Sara DuBois (1747–1821)
          - Margaret Hasbrouck (1773–1847) m. William Peters (1773–1814)
            - Sarah Peters (1796–1866) m. John Lounsbery (1803–1864)
              - Sarah Lounsberry (1837–1908) m. Abraham Gaasbeek DeWitt (1835–1918)
                - Matthew TenEyck DeWitt (1874–1935)- DeWitt served as the town of Hurley supervisor from 1910 to 1911, 1914-1915, 1924-1927, and 1933-1935
        - Benjamin Hasbrouck (1764–1843) m. Rachel Hasbrouck (1779–1843)
          - Blandinah Bruyn Hasbrouck (1814–1852) m. Daniel Hasbrouck (1808–1898)
            - Mary Catherine Hasbrouck (1847–1925) m. William Charles Anderson (1838–1902)
              - Charles Anderson (1877–1931) m. Stella Edith Baker (1881–1938)
                - Howard Calvin Anderson (1910–1996)- Anderson served as the town of Rochester town clerk (1934–1935) and town supervisor (1936-1941, 1948-1953), as well as the Ulster County Sheriff (1942–1944)
  - Abraham Hasbrouck (1650–1717) m. Maria Deyo (1653–1741)
    - Rachel Hasbrouck (1680-bef. 1717) m. Louis DuBois Jr. (1677–1749)
      - Nathaniel DuBois (1703–1763) m. Geertruy Bruyn (1709-?)
        - Rachel DuBois (1727–1781) m. Andries LeFevre (1722–1812)- LeFevre served as the town of New Paltz supervisor in 1766 and 1781
          - Nathaniel LeFevre (1749–1817) m. Maria Deyo (1748–1817)
            - Rachel LeFevre (1778–1831) m. Jonas DuBois (1770–1844)
              - LeFevre DuBois (1801–1881) m. Rebecca DuBois (1807–1876)
                - Garret Louis DuBois (1842–1913) m. Hannah Frances Constable (1850–1901)
                  - Fred DuBois (1881–1950) m. Anna Frances Buchanan (1880–1964)- see above
                    - Fred Haddon DuBois (1911–2002)- see above
          - Maria LeFevre (1756–1793) m. Abraham Deyo III (1736–1808)
            - Abraham A. Deyo (1793–1873) m. Margaret T. Deyo (1792–1860)- see above
              - Abraham A. Deyo Jr. (1819–1883)- see above
      - Jonathan DuBois (1710–1746) m. Elizabeth LeFevre (1712–1749)
        - Louis Jonathan DuBois (1733–1813) m. Catrina Brodhead (1738–1795)
          - Jonathan DuBois (1763–1832)- DuBois served as the town of New Paltz supervisor in 1820
          - Jonas DuBois (1770–1844) m. Rachel LeFevre (1778–1831)
            - LeFevre DuBois (1801–1881) m. Rebecca DuBois (1807–1876)
              - Garret Louis DuBois (1842–1913) m. Hannah Frances Constable (1850–1901)
                - Fred DuBois (1881–1950) m. Anna Frances Buchanan (1880–1964)- see above
                  - Fred Haddon DuBois (1911–2002)- see above
        - Andries DuBois (1737-?) m. Sarah LeFevre (1736-?)
          - Elsje DuBois (1771–1843) m. Philip LeFevre (1763–1840)
            - Andries P. LeFevre (1793–1865) m. Magdalene Elting (1796–1852)
              - Maria LeFevre (1816–1905) m. Jonathan Nathaniel Deyo (1805–1886)
                - Andrew LeFevre Deyo (1845–1926)- see above
      - Catharine DuBois (1714–1774) m. Wessel Brodhead (1703–1774)
        - Catrina Brodhead (1738–1795) m. Louis Jonathan DuBois (1733–1813)
          - Jonathan DuBois (1763–1832)- see above
          - Jonas DuBois (1770–1844) m. Rachel LeFevre (1778–1831)
            - LeFevre DuBois (1801–1881) m. Rebecca DuBois (1807–1876)
              - Garret Louis DuBois (1842–1913) m. Hannah Frances Constable (1850–1901)
                - Fred DuBois (1881–1950) m. Anna Frances Buchanan (1880–1964)- see above
                  - Fred Haddon DuBois (1911–2002)- see above
    - Joseph Hasbrouck (1683–1724) m. Elsie Schoonmaker (1685–1764)
      - Abraham Hasbrouck (1707–1791) m. Catherine Bruyn (1720–1793)
        - Isaac Hasbrouck (1712–1778) m. Antjen Louw (1728–1784)- Hasbrouck served as the town of Shawangunk supervisor from 1751 to 1752
          - Jannetje Hasbrouck (1769–1812) m. Johannes Crispell (1764–1842)
            - Petrus Crispell (1794–1878)- Crispell served as the town of Hurley supervisor from 1845 to 1848
            - Antje Crispell (1796–1860) m. TenEyck DeWitt (1792–1883)
              - Abraham Gaasbeek DeWitt (1835–1918) m. Sarah Lounsberry (1837–1908)
                - Matthew TenEyck DeWitt (1874–1935)- see above
        - Jacobus Hasbrouck (1753–1819) m. Maria DeWitt (1760–1798)
          - Maria Hasbrouck (1793–1851) m. Charles DeWitt Bruyn (1784–1849)
            - Charles DeWitt Bruyn Jr. (1834–1897)- Bruyn served as a city of Kingston First Ward supervisor in 1873
      - Petronella Hasbrouck (1710-aft. 1774) m. Simon LeFever (1709–1743)
        - Sarah LeFevre (1736-?) m. Andries DuBois (1737-?)
          - Elsje DuBois (1771–1843) m. Philip LeFevre (1763–1840)
            - Andries P. LeFevre (1793–1865) m. Magdalene Elting (1796–1852)
              - Maria LeFevre (1816–1905) m. Jonathan Nathaniel Deyo (1805–1886)
                - Andrew LeFevre Deyo (1845–1926)- see above
    - Daniel Hasbrouck (1692–1759) m. Wyntje Deyo (1706–1787)
      - Jonas Hasbrouck (1736–1824) m. Catharine DuBois (1738–1814)
        - Josaphat DuBois Hasbrouck (1767–1832) m. Jane Hoornbeck (1767–1853)
          - Daniel Hasbrouck (1808–1898) m. Blandinah Bruyn Hasbrouck (1814–1852)
            - Mary Catherine Hasbrouck (1847–1925) m. William Charles Anderson (1838–1902)
              - Charles Anderson (1877–1931) m. Stella Edith Baker (1881–1938)
                - Howard Calvin Anderson (1910–1996)- see above
      - David Hasbrouck (1740–1806) m. Maria Hoogland (1746–1825)
        - Blandinah Bruyn Hasbrouck (1814–1852) m. Daniel Hasbrouck (1808–1898)
          - Mary Catherine Hasbrouck (1847–1925) m. William Charles Anderson (1838–1902)
            - Charles Anderson (1877–1931) m. Stella Edith Baker (1881–1938)
              - Howard Calvin Anderson (1910–1996)- see above

== Influence on Ulster County ==
The lasting impacts of the Huguenots and their arrival to Ulster County can be seen in present-day around the area, especially in New Paltz. The local high school possesses the nickname of "Hugies," short for Huguenots. There is a Manheim Boulevard, named after the town in Germany many of the families fled to before coming to the United States. Also contained in the town or village of New Paltz are Hasbrouck Park, a playground-based park located near the SUNY New Paltz.

Following a fire in 1884, the New Paltz Classical School offered to their land to New York State to create a normal school. The creation of this normal school was overseen by a Board of Trustees of 14 individuals; one president, one secretary and 12 voting members. This board was instrumental in the creation of the normal school and establishing the roots for SUNY New Paltz. Every member on this board was a descendant of the original patentee families of New Paltz:

1. Elting Tjerck Deyo (1830–1907)- member; descendant of the Deyo, Freer and Crispell families
2. Solomon Deyo (1834–1904)- secretary; descendant of Deyo, DuBois, LeFevre, Hasbrouck
3. Gilbert DuBois (1819–1886)- member; descendant of DuBois family
4. Henry J. DuBois (1829–1907)- member; descendant of DuBois, Freer, Deyo and Hasbrouck families
5. Henry Hasbrouck Elting (1850–1907)- member; descendant of DuBois, Deyo, Freer, Hasbrouck and Bevier families
6. Jesse Elting (1838–1922)- member; descendant of DuBois, Deyo, Freer, LeFevre, and Hasbrouck families
7. Philip LeFevre Elting (1836–1919)- member; descendant of DuBois, Deyo, Freer, LeFevre, Hasbrouck and Bevier families
8. Josiah J. Hasbrouck (1843–1913)- member; descendant of Hasbrouck, Deyo, Bevier, DuBois, and LeFevre families
9. Philip Bevier Hasbrouck (1825–1906)- member; descendant of Hasbrouck, Bevier, Deyo, and DuBois families
10. Lambert Jenkins (1821–1901)- member; descendant of LeFevre, Deyo, DuBois, Hasbrouck
11. Simon Peter Snyder Keator (1828–1899)- member; descendant of Freer family
12. DuBois LeFevre (1824–1904)- member; descendant of LeFevre, Deyo, DuBois, and Hasbrouck families
13. Ralph LeFevre (1844–1925)- president; descendant of LeFevre, Deyo, Freer, DuBois and Hasbrouck families
14. Jacob Louw Snyder (1836–1913)- member; descendant of DuBois, Hasbrouck, and Deyo families

Through the efforts of this board, as well as the last names of the patentees of New Paltz, many of the buildings on the campus were named after the Huguenots, in an area called the Hasbrouck Complex. There was Deyo Hall, DuBois Hall, Hasbrouck Hall, Bevier Hall, Crispell Hall and LeFevre Hall; as well as the Hasbrouck Dining Hall and the Elting Gymnasium (the Elting family was not considered a Patentee family, but were significant in the early days of New Paltz; Roelif Elting, one of the first to the area, married Sara DuBois, daughter of Patentee Abraham DuBois and granddaughter of patentees Louis DuBois and Christian Deyo). However, these names were changed in 2019 after a long-term research project in which it was decided that due to the Patentees and their owning of slaves, that the buildings should not bear their names any longer.

Some of the street names in New Paltz reflect the families as well, with Huguenot Street being the most obvious. Other names that appear include Hasbrouck Avenue, Hasbrouck Place, Huguenot Court, Elting Avenue, Henry W. DuBois Drive (named for Henry William DuBois, mayor of the village of New Paltz from 1958 to 1975), Duzine Road (douze is French for 12, meant to represent the 12 patentees), and Holland Lane (several Huguenots fled to the Netherlands to avoid persecution).

Hasbrouck Park in Kingston was one of the city's first downtown parks, opened in 1920. Many streets in Kingston possess Huguenot backstories, including Bernard Street (named for Reuben Bernard, who married a Crispell), Bruyn Street (named for Charles D. Bruyn, whose mother was a Hasbrouck and Cornelius Bruyn, who married first a Bevier and secondly the daughter of a Hasbrouck), DeWitt Street (named for Jacob Hasbrouck DeWitt, whose mother was a Hasbrouck), Deyo Street (named for Sylvester R. Deyo, direct descendant of patentee Christian Deyo), DuBois Street (named for Josiah DuBois Jr., a direct descendant of patentee Louis DuBois), Kiersted Avenue (named for Christopher Kierstede, who married a DuBois), Hasbrouck Avenue and Hasbrouck Place (named for Abraham Joseph Hasbrouck), Abruyn Street (named for Abraham Bruyn Hasbrouck) and Catharine Street (named for Catharine Hasbrouck Ludlum).

There is also a Hasbrouck Avenue in Highland, New York, and Port Ewen, New York, a Hasbrouck Lane in Woodstock, New York, and Port Ewen, and a Hasbrouck Drive in Wallkill, New York, Poughkeepsie, New York, Newburgh, New York, and Garnerville, New York.
