= Major Jacob Hasbrouck Jr. House =

- U.S. National Register of Historic Places
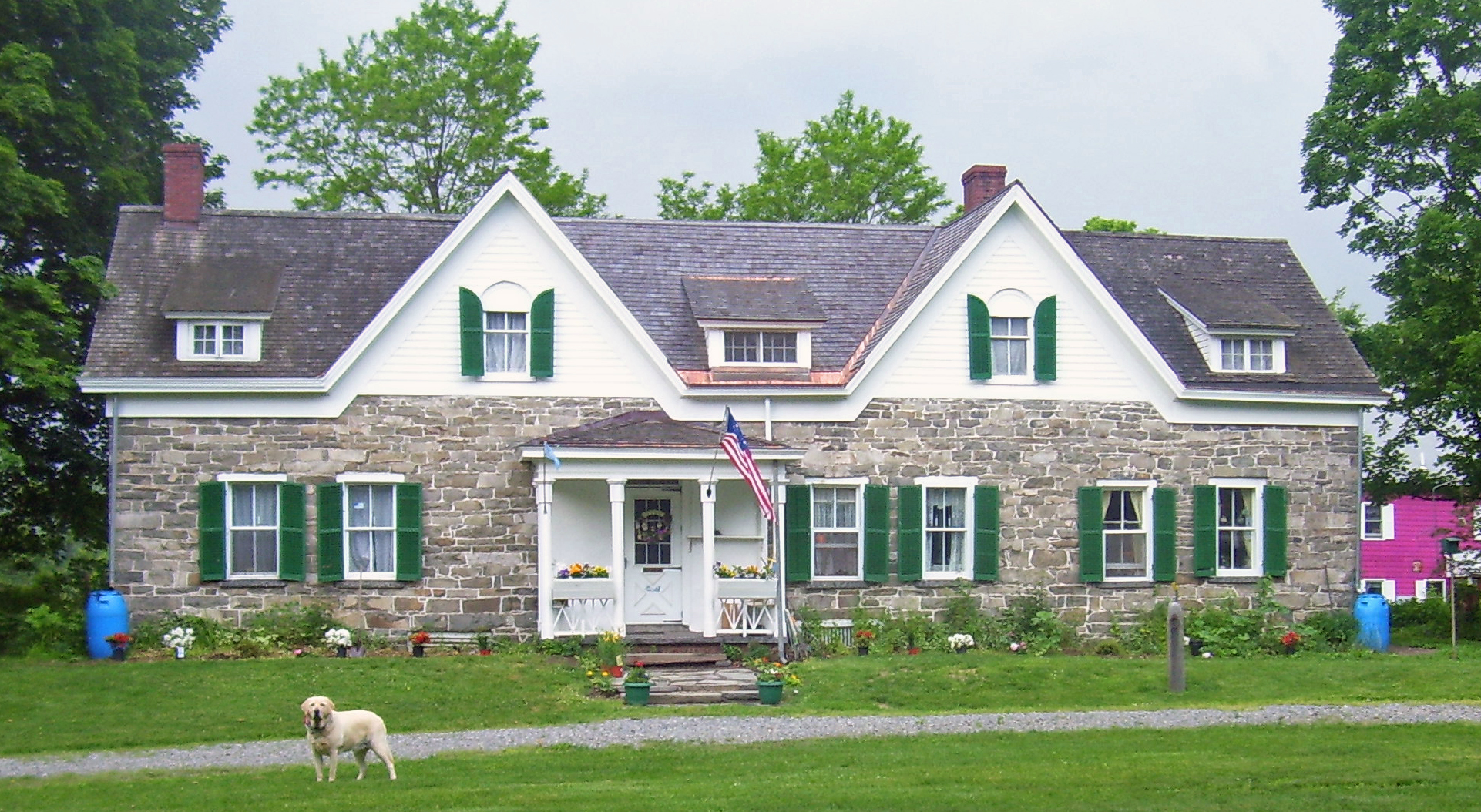
- Front (east) elevation, 2008

- Location within New York Location within the United States
- Location: New Paltz, NY
- Nearest city: Poughkeepsie
- Coordinates: 41°45′38″N 74°5′11″W
- Area: 5 acres (20,000 m^{2})
- Built: 1786
- Architectural style: Dutch Colonial
- NRHP reference No.: 99000808
- Added to NRHP: July 23, 1999

The Major Jacob Hasbrouck Jr. House is located on Huguenot Street in the Town of New Paltz, New York, United States. It was built in 1786 by Hasbrouck, grandson of Jean Hasbrouck, one of the original Huguenot settlers of the New Paltz area in the late 17th century, after he had moved out of the family home, two miles (3.2 km) to the south in what is today the Huguenot Street Historic District. A descendant of his lives in the house today, and it is believed to be the only 18th-century stone house in the New Paltz area continuously owned by the family that first built it.

Hasbrouck's house shows sophistication and refinement befitting a large landholder who served as town supervisor and later in the American Revolutionary War. It is the culmination of the Dutch/Belgian-style stone houses that had been built all over Ulster County during the preceding century. His descendants found the house somewhat confining and, over several different generations, modified it in ways that reflected the changing tastes of the 19th and 20th centuries. It was listed on the National Register of Historic Places in 1999.

== Property ==
The house is located on a 5-acre (20,000 m^{2}) lot on the west side of the street. There are several outbuildings from the former farm, no longer in use for their original purpose.

Its original section is the front block, a one-and-a-half-story with 20-inch (510 mm) thick load-bearing stone walls. A porch covers the front entrance between two of the three pairs of windows; the upper story has two large, wooden gabled dormers added later, between the three small shed dormers remaining from the original house. In the rear is another later addition, a section called the "outlet", after the Dutch "uitlayt", a one-story stone enclosure 12 feet (3.7 m) wide across the entire rear section, with its own basement.

The interior of the main block follows the standard 18th-century center-hall plan, with the kitchen on one side and the parlor on the other. The outlet is partitioned into five rooms, three connecting to the kitchen side of the house and two to the parlor.

In the rear of the lot are three farm buildings: a granary that has since itself been converted into a house, a greatly deteriorated chicken coop, and a modern barn used for storing firewood. There is also a baseball field used for local Little League games on the southwest corner. None of those are considered contributing resources. An old well house behind the kitchen side is, as is the stone wall on the front and north side of the property.

== History ==
=== The Hasbroucks in the 18th century ===
The land on which the house stands was originally part of Jean Hasbrouck's vast holdings in the area that is today the town and village of New Paltz and the surrounding lower Wallkill Valley. He died in 1714, thirteen years before the birth of Jacob Hasbrouck's youngest son, Jacob Jr., in 1727.

Jacob lived in the family homestead with his father, as his older brothers moved out to the land their father had already planned to divide between them in his will. Jacob Jr. was originally to receive only cash and bonds, on the assumption he would inherit the family house, but shortly after the will was drawn up in 1747 Benjamin Hasbrouck, the oldest son, died in a fall from a horse. The document was quickly revised to give the younger Jacob title to the lands between the Wallkill and the mountains known today as the Shawangunk Ridge, considered the best in the Hasbrouck tract. Jacob the elder died in 1761 and the lands and house became his son's.

The year afterward he served the first of two stretches as town supervisor. He continued to work with the other descendants of New Paltz's original Duzine ("Dozen") on the further subdivision and development of the original lands. In the early 1770s he returned as supervisor again, stepping down in 1776 when the war began as he had already been commissioned as a captain of the Second New Paltz Company of the Third Regiment of the Ulster County Militia. Three years later, he was promoted to major, and would forever after be known by that title in family histories to distinguish him from his father and his son, Jacob J. Hasbrouck.

According to Hasbrouck family tradition, Major Hasbrouck built the house in 1786 for Jacob J., the younger of his two sons, to live in after he died, while his brother Josiah lived in the old house. The Major moved in to spend his later years there, no longer extensively involved in either farming the property or land deals, although an assessment done for the 1798 federal Direct Tax, when he still owned both houses, rated him the wealthiest man in New Paltz. He died in 1806, and passed the house to Jacob J. and his growing family.

=== 19th century ===
The younger man needed more space, and built the rear extension known as the "outlet", from the Dutch uitlayt, a common term for that kind of extension in Dutch architecture. It was 12 feet (4 m) wide, running the entire width of the house and continuing the slope of the roof. Jacob left his initials in the plaster of the north wall interior. A neoclassical-styled archway was the main portal between the outlet and the main house. These renovations were complete by 1810.

In 1825, Jacob J. Hasbrouck moved out to a brick farmhouse two miles (3.2 km) along the Wallkill to retire; his son, Maurice, took over the main stone house and devoted himself primarily to the farm, as most of the family's land had been subdivided and sold. He undertook no major renovations other than whatever routine maintenance the house needed, and moved out in 1870 when his own son, Abram, married and needed the space as his grandfather had before him. The house, by this time, was almost a century old and badly needed to be restored. The original Hasbrouck land parcels had long been divided up, leaving only 400 acres (160 ha), and the family had moved on to other sources of income. By the mid-19th century, tax assessments suggest that the stone houses that had symbolized their earlier wealth were losing their appeal as younger homeowners embraced newer styles.

Abram's most visible changes, begun in 1876, were the two front window gables, adding a Picturesque aspect to the house, and an update to the front entranceway and the accompanying hall, although it is uncertain from the house today exactly what changes were made. The porch roof may have been changed to its flat hipped style, more consistent with tastes of the time.

=== 20th century ===
Upon his death in 1910, the house passed to his daughter, Laura, and the woman he married after her mother had died. After her stepmother died in 1924, Laura began to spend more of her time at a house in the nearby village, reflecting the completion of the early aspirations of the Hasbroucks and other Duzine members. She sold half of the remaining land for houses after Route 32 was built through the property in the late 1920s.

Eight years later, in 1932, she married and moved to Ossining, leaving the house to caretakers and returning to it only on weekends. Aware of the historic significance of the house, she became active in early local preservation efforts, and encouraged her caretaker, a Danish stonemason, to do some restoration work. He redid the walls (particularly the joints, removing any trace of earlier efforts) and the chimneys and fireplaces. Laura also had him build a new staircase inside, and remove the plaster ceilings to restore a more authentic original appearance to the house.

In 1944, she sold the rest of the property save the two acres (8,000 m^{2}) around the house. The north end was remodeled into a caretaker's residence, although it had to be rebuilt to its original appearance after a fire destroyed it. Laura Hasbrouck died childless in 1964 and willed it to Richard Relyea Hasbrouck, a descendant of Maurice Hasbrouck's brother Huram, specifically to keep it in the family, since he had two sons already. He only found out when the estate's lawyer called and said he had to start paying taxes on the property.

The newest Hasbrouck, like earlier residents, renovated the house to suit the needs of his family and his time. An interior frame wall was added to conserve heat in the old house, and a new kitchen was built. Thirty years after moving in, in 1994 one of the partitions in the outlet was removed to create a larger bedroom. He bought the 3 acres (12,000 m^{2}) with the old farm buildings on it, bringing the property to its current size.

== Aesthetics ==
According to architectural historian Neil Larson, the house represents the culmination of Ulster County's traditional stone houses. Originally built on a European model for urban areas, they had been small rectangles similar to the Jean Hasbrouck House and the other older Huguenot Street homes, sometimes with their sides facing the street as in that neighborhood's Bevier House. As the children of the Duzine moved out into the surrounding lands, the houses evolved into farmhouses with a three-room plan, since builders could take advantage of larger lots. Using this form may have been a conscious choice on Major Hasbrouck's part to preserve his ancestral culture, since some of his contemporaries later built themselves homes in more English-influenced styles like Josiah Hasbrouck's Locust Lawn.

The builder of Major Hasbrouck's house formalized this, providing a facade with continuous horizontal lines uniting all the family spaces. There are none of the vertical interruptions seen on other stone houses. The stones chosen were carefully dressed, although not to the point of making an ashlar pattern. The kitchen wing to the north was placed asymmetrically, to highlight its difference in function.

Inside, the house was more in accord with traditional stone house, at least in its early years, in having little decoration save the doors and trim, since the Major despite his wealth and fame would have wanted to appear humble and pious. His son's efforts to change this by adding a decorated archway, plastering over the ceilings and using charcoal to marbleize some of the walls suggest he was uncomfortable with the already dated style of the house as well as its physical limitations to his family. A similar impulse may have been behind Maurice Hasbrouck's additions of distinctly contemporary features to the house later in the 19th century.
