= Jean Hasbrouck House =

House in New Paltz, New York

- U.S. National Register of Historic Places
- U.S. National Historic Landmark
- U.S. National Historic Landmark District – Contributing property
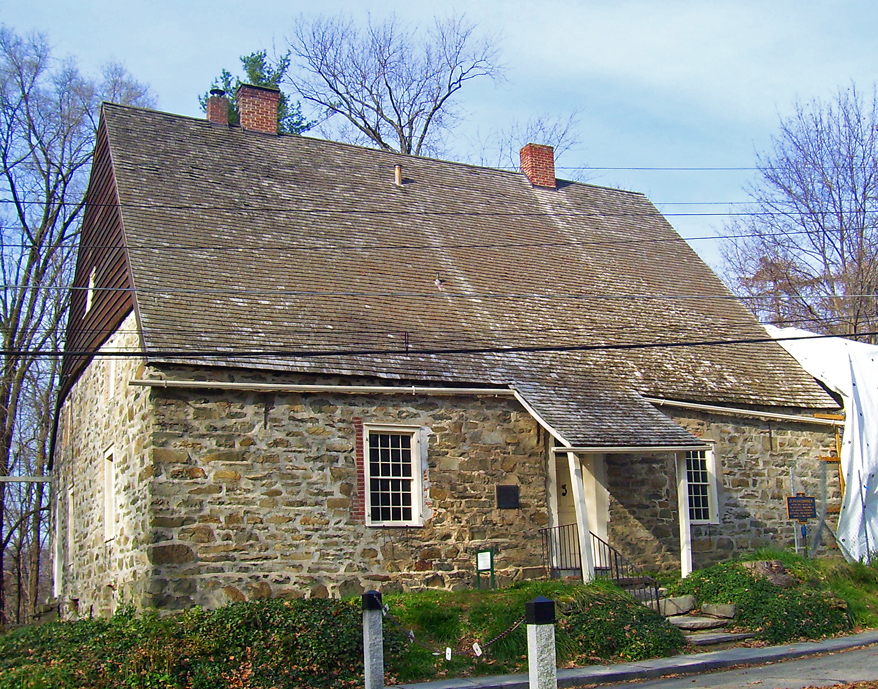

- Location within New York Location within the United States
- Interactive map showing the location for Hasbrouck House
- Location: Huguenot Street, New Paltz, New York
- Nearest city: Poughkeepsie
- Coordinates: 41°45′03.1″N 74°05′17.8″W
- Area: less than one acre
- Built: 1694; 1712
- Architectural style: Stone house
- Part of: Huguenot Street Historic District (ID66000578)
- NRHP reference No.: 67000016

Significant dates
- Added to NRHP: December 24, 1967
- Designated NHL: December 24, 1967
- Designated NHLDCP: October 9, 1960

The Jean Hasbrouck House is a historic house on Historic Huguenot Street in New Paltz, New York. Built in 1721, it is one of the best examples of colonial Dutch architecture in stone in the United States. The house is a National Historic Landmark and is part of the larger Huguenot Street Historic District, also a National Historic Landmark.

== History of the house ==
The house was built in 1721 by Jean Hasbrouck's son Jacob, and perhaps incorporates elements of a timber-framed home built by Jean Hasbrouck on the same site circa 1678. The Hasbroucks were Huguenots who fled persecution in France and co-founded New Paltz. Their house is considered an excellent example of Hudson Valley Dutch architecture and is well preserved. It received its current designation in 1967.

Significant features include a wide center hallway, a substantial attic space, originally used as a garret, and the only original 18th century jambless fireplace found in the houses of Historic Huguenot Street. The north wall underwent a substantial restoration in 2006, which included the installation of reproduction Dutch-style casement windows.

The house served as both a home for family members and a store for the small village. Several enslaved individuals owned by the Hasbroucks also lived on the site, three of whom were named in Jean Hasbrouck's will as "Gerritt," "James," and "Molly." Several generations of Hasbrouck family members lived in the house, including Josiah Hasbrouck, who served in U.S. Congress during the Thomas Jefferson and James Madison administrations, and who built the substantial Locust Lawn Estate just outside New Paltz.

The house was purchased by the organization known today as Historic Huguenot Street in 1899, and has been used as a museum ever since. Guided tours are available to the public by appointment.
