= Locust Lawn Estate =

- Locust Lawn
- U.S. National Register of Historic Places
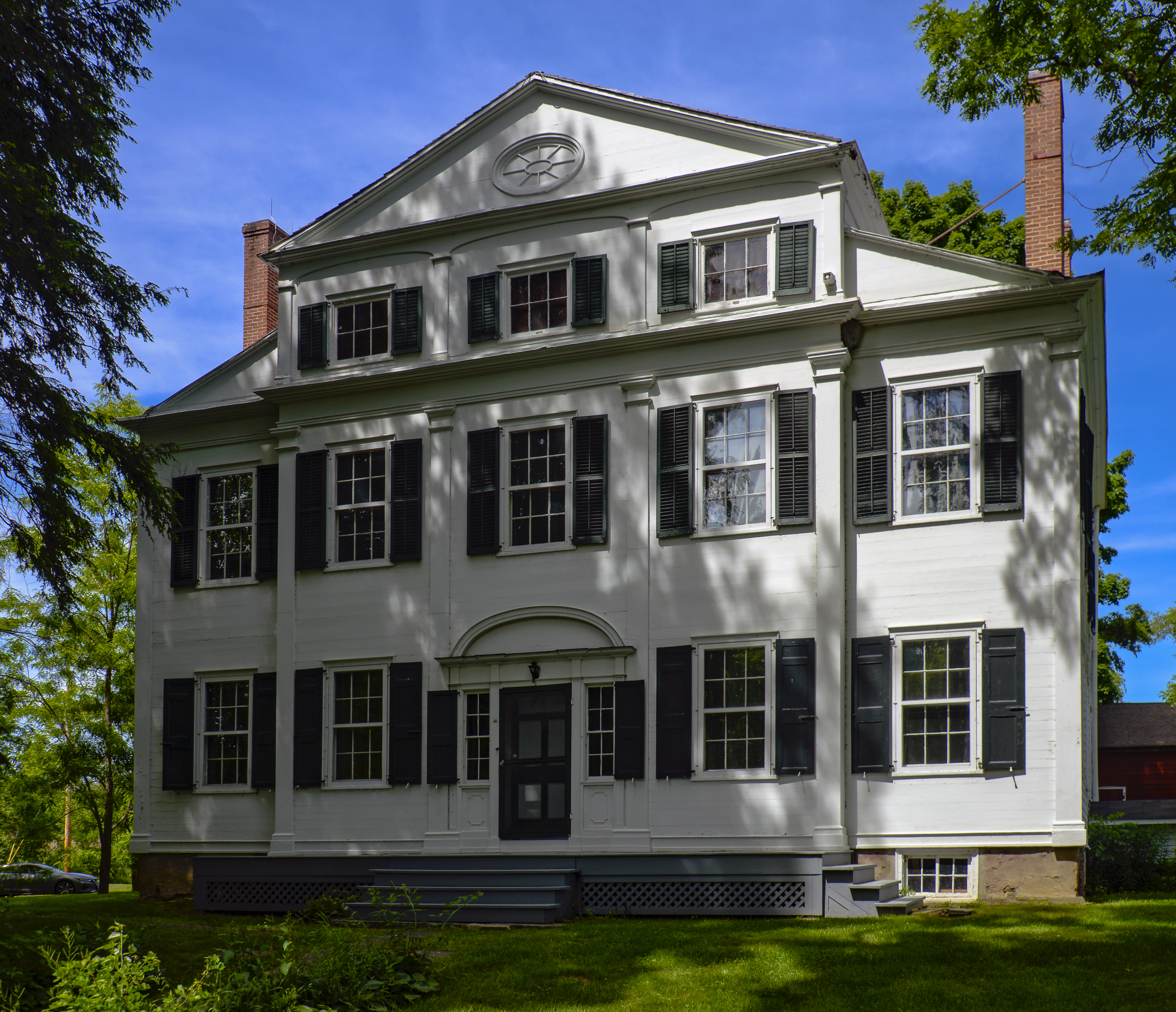
- Front elevation, 2019

- Location within New York Location within the United States
- Interactive map showing the location for Locust Lawn Estate
- Location: Gardiner, NY
- Nearest city: Poughkeepsie
- Coordinates: 41°41′51″N 74°06′08″W
- Area: 24 acres (9.7 ha)
- Built: 1738
- Architect: Cromwell; Schoonmaker, Hendrick
- Architectural style: Federal
- NRHP reference No.: 74001313
- Added to NRHP: May 17, 1974

Locust Lawn is a surviving 19th-century farm complex situated on the bank of the Plattekill Creek on New York State Route 32, outside of New Paltz, Ulster County, New York.

The centerpiece of Locust Lawn is the Jeffersonian mansion of Colonel Josiah Hasbrouck which remains without modern heating, plumbing and electrical systems. The site also features the earlier Evert Terwilliger House.

Locust Lawn has been listed on the National Register of Historic Places since 1974. The site was donated to Historic Huguenot Street by Hasbrouck descendant Annette Young in 1958. In 2010 the house and collections were transferred to the Locust Grove Estate, another museum property founded by Annette Young. The site is open to the public by appointment.

== Josiah Hasbrouck House ==
In 1805, Josiah Hasbrouck returned from his first stint in Congress during the administration of Thomas Jefferson eager to create for his family a home worthy of their position in the small but growing community, which was founded by Huguenots in 1678. Hasbrouck was a descendant of Huguenot Jean Hasbrouck, one of the founders, or patentees, of New Paltz. In addition to his service in Congress, Hasbrouck served with the Ulster County Militia during the American Revolutionary War, in the New York State Assembly and as New Paltz town supervisor

Along with his wife Sara Decker, Hasbrouck purchased the Terwilliger family homestead a few miles south of the village of New Paltz. At the time, the site was a small farm and mill and featured a modest stone house built 67 years earlier. Over the next several years, Hasbrouck acquired additional acreage, ultimately increasing the size of the farm to 1,200 acres (490 ha). He also set about building a dramatic Federal style mansion, which was completed in 1814.

The 3-story house features a center arched doorway and a symmetrical arrangement of windows. In the back of the house, there is a 1 1/2-story kitchen wing. Inside, the arrangement of rooms on the first and second floors is, for the most part, symmetrical as well, with rooms opening up from a wide center hallway. Faux marble plaster walls in the first-floor hallway date to 1814.

The home was lived in by Josiah and Sarah's descendants until 1885, when the family locked all of their belongings in one half of the house and rented the remainder to tenants who farmed the surrounding land. So things remained for almost 75 years, when the house was donated to Historic Huguenot Street. Today, the house features many of the Hasbrouck's family possessions set up as they were when the house was occupied by Josiah, Sarah and their descendants.

== Evert Terwilliger House ==
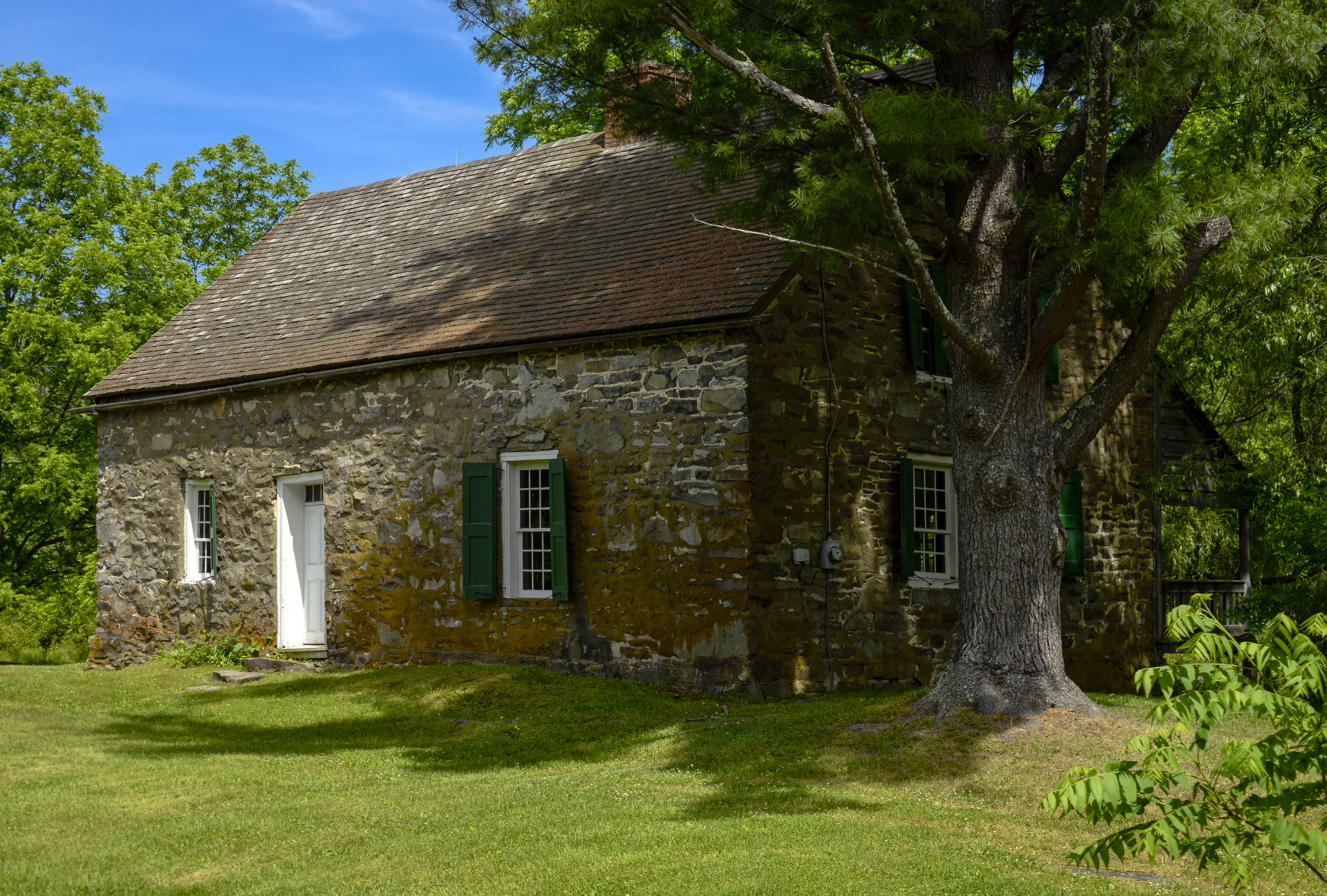
Terwilliger House

The homestead Josiah Hasbrouck bought in 1805 was originally settled by Evert Terwilliger, a Dutch man, in 1738 after he married Sara Freer. Sara was the daughter of Hugo Freer, one of the French-speaking Huguenot founders, or patentees, of New Paltz. Evert and Sara's son Jonathan expanded the home in 1764. The house is a good example of the Dutch-style stone houses built in this region during the eighteenth century. One and a half stories in height, the house originally had a gable-end entry (similar to that which still exists in the Bevier-Elting House at Historic Huguenot Street). A porch running the length of the house, another feature of front-gable Dutch houses in America and the Netherlands in the 17th and 18th centuries, overlooks the Plattekill Creek. This creek and the falls just beyond the house were used by the Terwilliger family to operate a grist mill and saw mill at the site. The house was acquired by Historic Huguenot Street in 1973 with the financial assistance of the then newly formed Terwilliger Family Association. The Terwilliger Family Association continues to support the maintenance and preservation of the home.

== See also ==
- National Register of Historic Places listings in Ulster County, New York
