= Huguenot Street Historic District =

Historic district in New York, United States

- Historic Huguenot Street
- U.S. National Register of Historic Places
- U.S. National Historic Landmark District
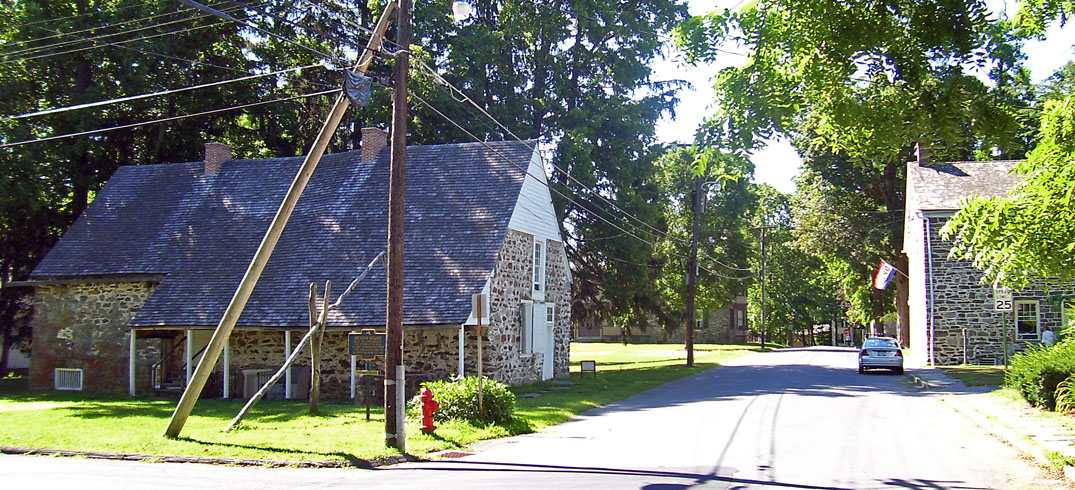
- The Bevier-Elting House, left, and Dubois Fort, location of the Visitor Center at Historic Huguenot Street

- Location within New York Location within the United States
- Location: New Paltz, New York
- Nearest city: Poughkeepsie
- Coordinates: 41°45′00″N 74°05′21″W
- Area: 10 acres (4.0 ha)
- Built: Founded 1678. Houses date to ca1705.
- Architectural style: Dutch-style colonial; Georgian.
- Visitation: 16,500 (2007)
- NRHP reference No.: 66000578

Significant dates
- Added to NRHP: October 15, 1966
- Designated NHLD: October 9, 1960

The Huguenot Street Historic District is located in New Paltz, New York, approximately 90 miles (140 km) north of New York City. The seven stone houses and several accompanying structures in the 10-acre National Landmark were likely built in the early 18th century by Huguenot settlers fleeing discrimination and religious persecution in France and modern-day southern Belgium. After negotiating with the Esopus Indians, this small group of Huguenots settled on a flat rise on the banks of the Wallkill River in 1678. The settlers named the site in honor of Die Pfalz, the region of present-day Germany that had provided them temporary refuge before they came to America.

Archaeological finds indicate that the immediate area settled by the Huguenots was occupied by Native Americans prior to European contact. The site is one of the oldest continuously inhabited settlements in the United States.

== Description ==
The house museums of Historic Huguenot Street are in their original village setting. The street has been included in the National Register of Historic Places since it was created in 1966, and was designated a National Historic Landmark in 1960.

In addition to the houses, the 10-acre (4.0 ha) site features a burying ground dating to the early 18th century, a reconstructed 1717 stone church, a visitor center, a library and archives, and spaces for other programming.

The site is owned and operated by Historic Huguenot Street, which was founded in 1894. In 1899, Historic Huguenot Street purchased the Jean Hasbrouck house as the first house museum on the street. In the 1950s and '60s, the organization and related family associations purchased most of the remaining stone houses in the district and subsequently opened them as museums. These acquisitions were funded in large part by descendants of the original Huguenot founders. Their family associations play a key role in supporting the institution today.

In the 1980s, the organization began offering related educational and informative programming to the public.

== Individual houses ==
=== Bevier-Elting House ===
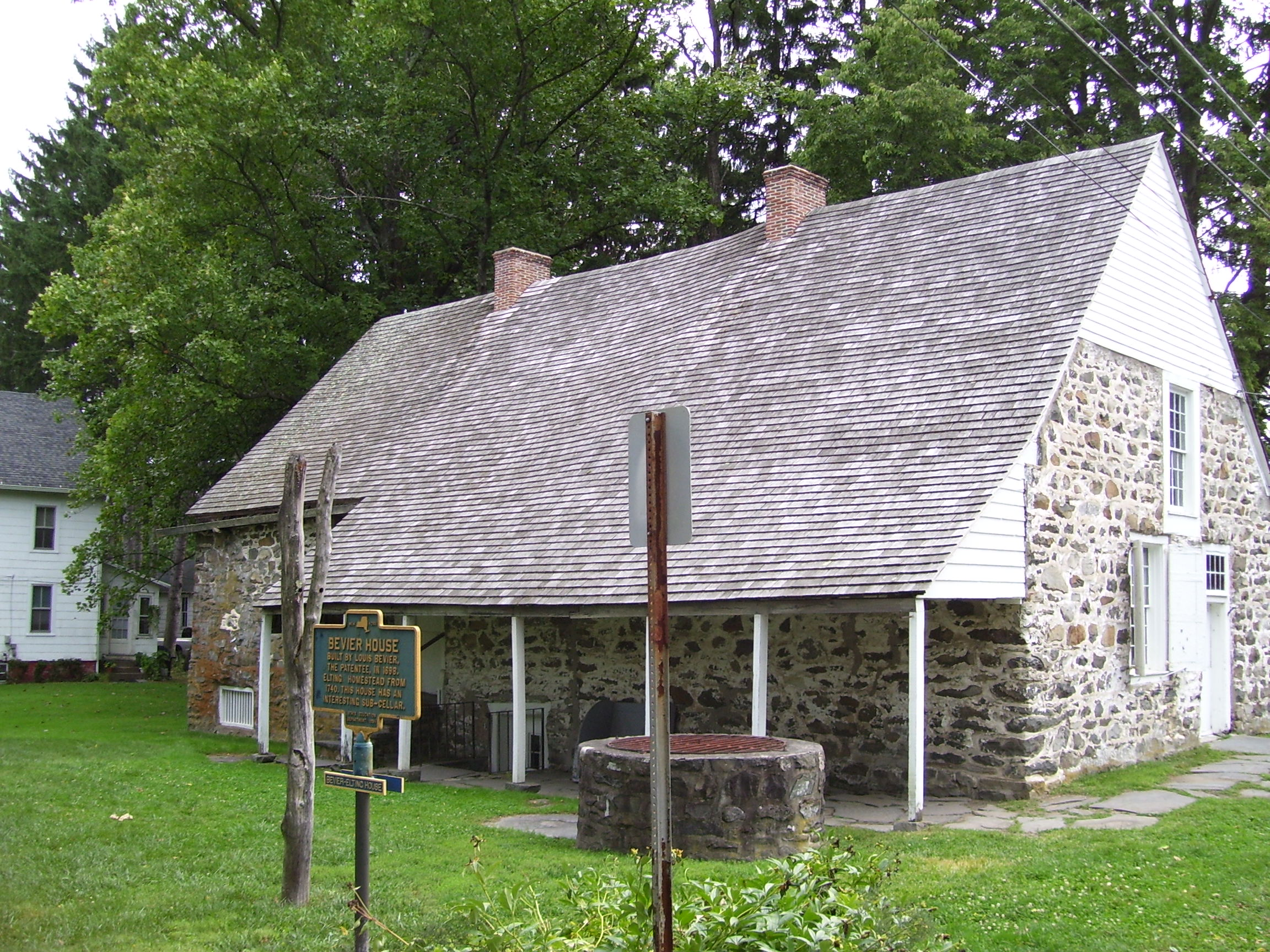
Bevier-Elting House in September 2010.

Dating to the very early 18th century, the house was originally a one-room building built with the narrow or gable end facing the

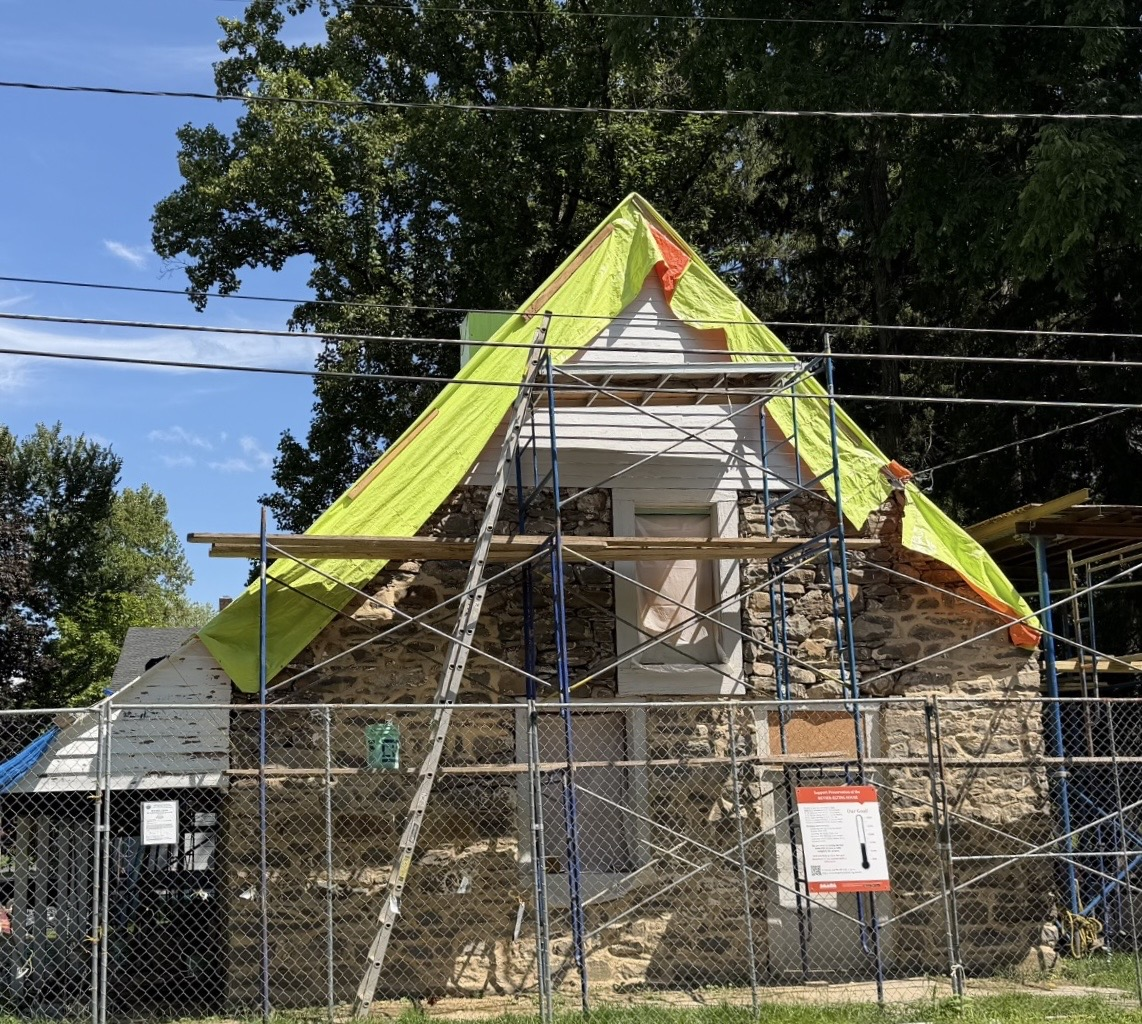
Bevier-Elting House undergoing renovations in August 2026.

street—then the prevailing style of the low countries of Northern Europe. Two expansions were built later, as was a small cellar that was used to house African slaves. The house was built by the Bevier family, one of the founding families, and subsequently sold to the Dutch Elting family.

=== Abraham Hasbrouck House ===
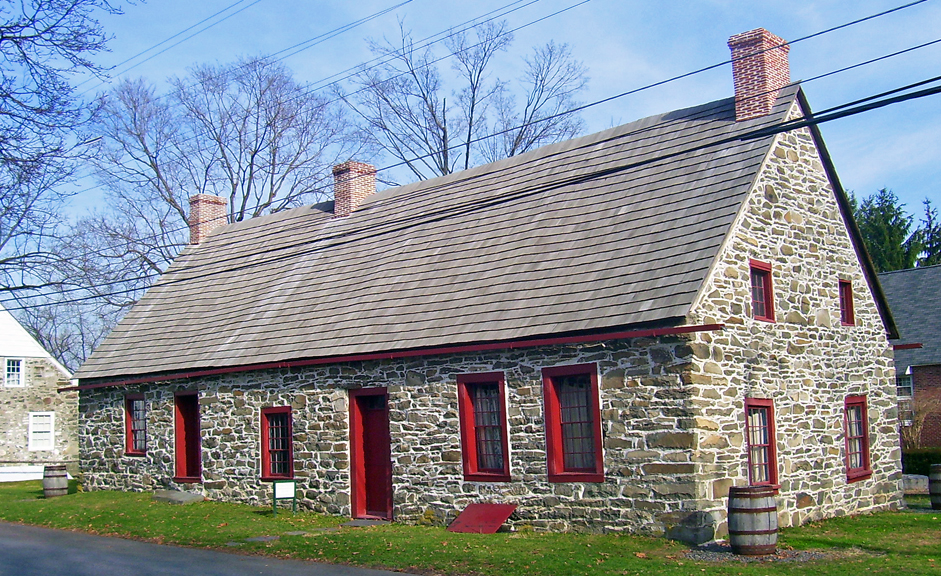
The Abraham (Daniel) Hasbrouck House

The structure known as the Abraham Hasbrouck House was built in three phases in the 1720s and 30s. The center room was constructed in 1721 by Daniel Hasbrouck, the son of Abraham Hasbrouck. That date is based on recent dendrochronology, a process by which wooden structural members are dated. This house represents a New World innovation in Dutch-style architecture. The initial houses in the Dutch region of New York—such as New Amsterdam, Albany, and Kingston—were built in the tradition of Dutch cities, with the gable-ends to the street, which conserves street frontage.

The basic structure of the house consists of a series of H-bents which spread the weight of the house across the entire expanse. The original one-room house exhibited several defining elements of Dutch architecture, the jambless fireplace being the principal and most recognized feature in the house. It recently re-opened to the public in July 2012 following a restoration and reinterpretation focusing on the life of Widow Wyntje.

=== Jean Hasbrouck House ===
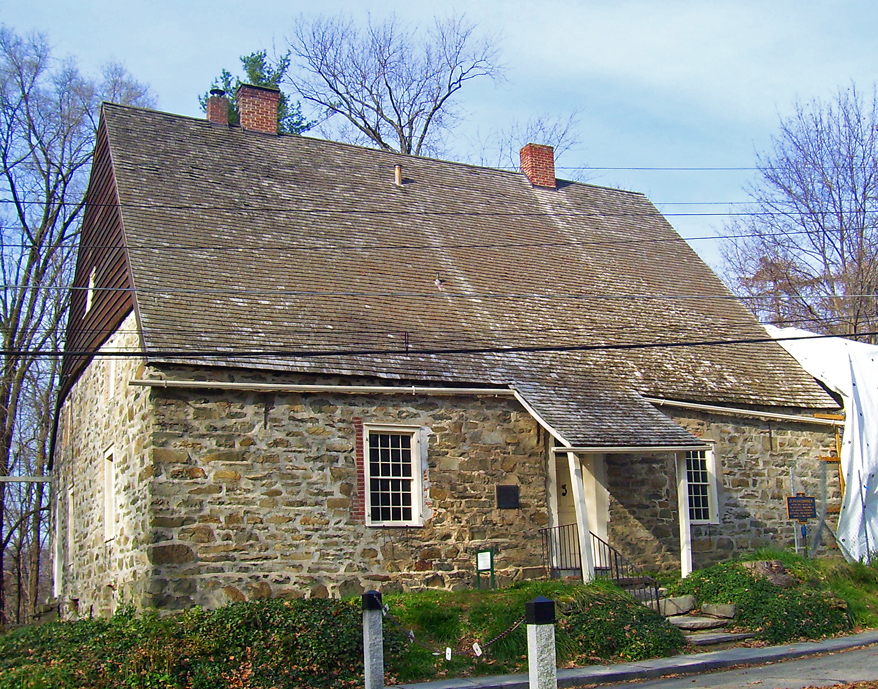
The Jean Hasbrouck House

Also built in 1721 by Jean's son Jacob (and perhaps incorporating elements of an early home built by New Paltz founder Jean Hasbrouck), this home is an example of Hudson Valley Dutch architecture and the showpiece of Historic Huguenot Street. A National Historic Landmark in its own right, it boasts the only remaining original jambless fireplace of any of the Huguenot Street houses, and is one of the few surviving examples in what was formerly the New Netherland.

In 2006, the north wall of the house was carefully dismantled, repaired and reconstructed. Reproduction Dutch-style casement windows were installed. Interior restoration followed, resulting in a house that is an example of how a comfortable family in the region lived in the mid-18th century.

=== DuBois Fort ===
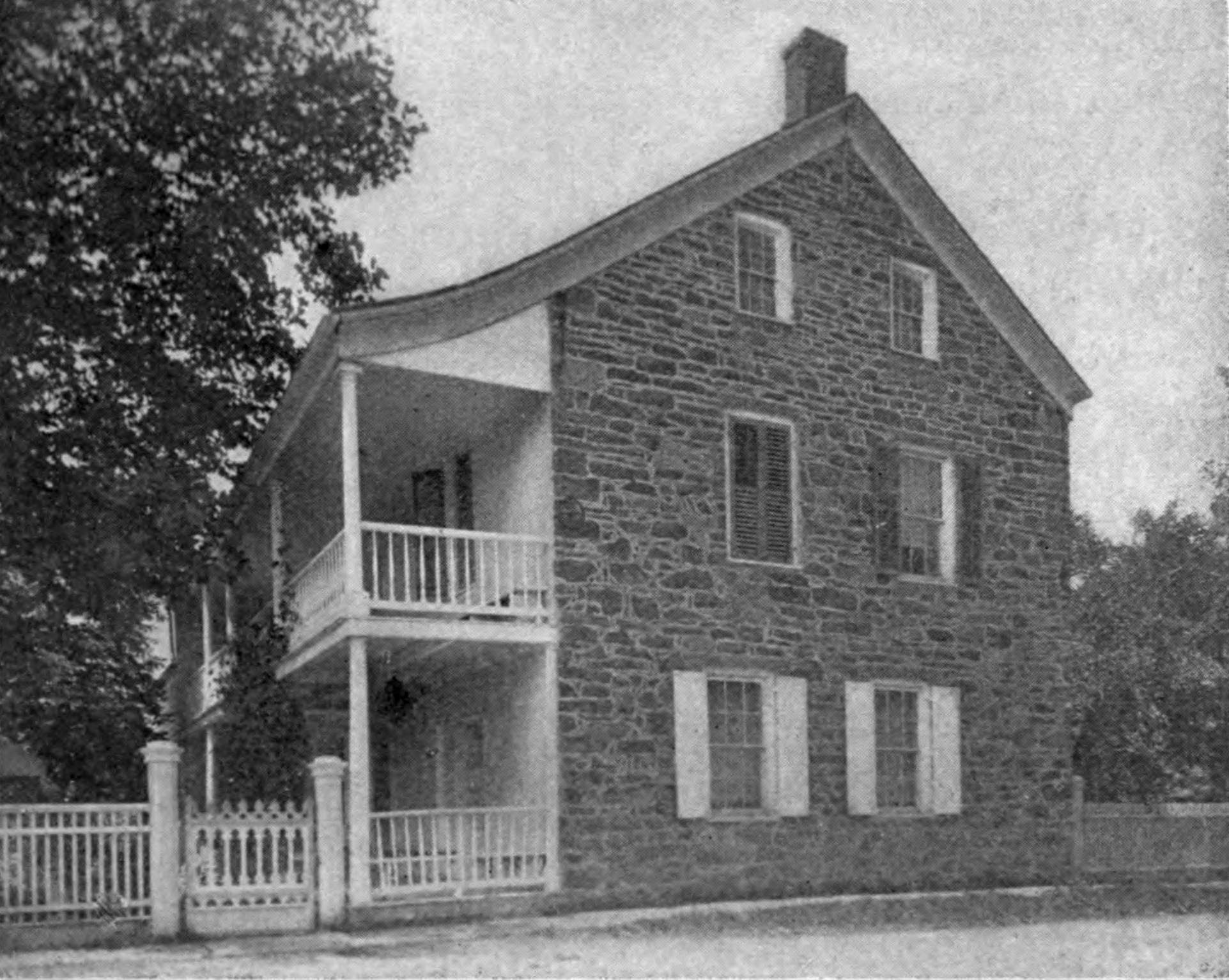
Louis DuBois House (aka the DuBois Fort) built 1705. Pictured circa 1900.

Built c. 1705 for the DuBois family, it might have served as a fortified place for protection for the small community if needed. Originally a smaller 1 1/2 story structure, this building was expanded to its current size in the late 1830s. Some historians and antiquarians believe that the presence of "gun ports" made it a fort, but there is no evidence of the presence of any such portholes before the 19th century. The DuBois Fort currently serves as the orientation center and gift shop, as well as a location for special events. Guests can purchase their admission tickets and memberships at this building. Over the last 300 years, it has also been used as a residence and a restaurant.

=== Freer House ===
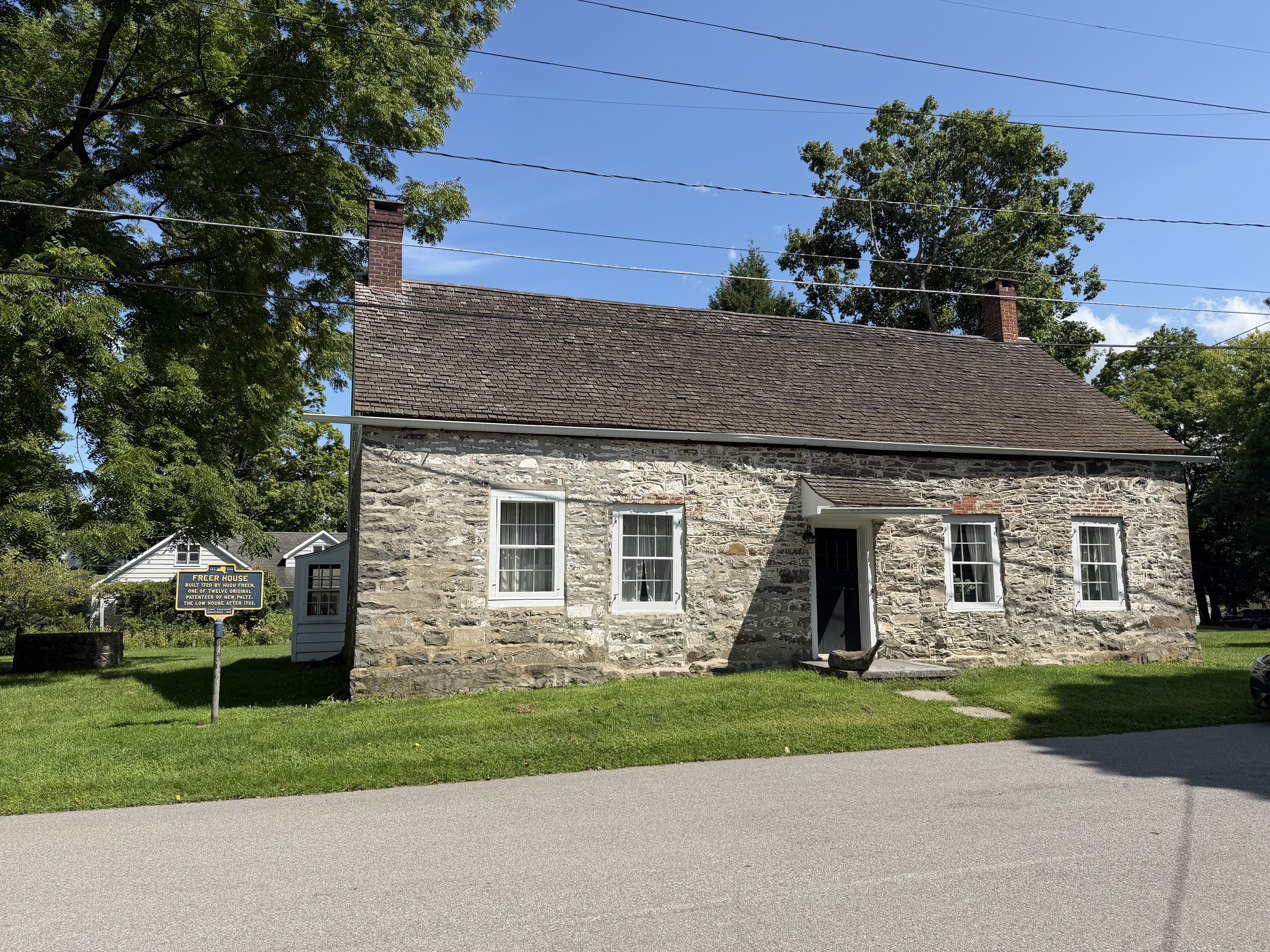
The Freer House pictured on August 24, 2026.

The Freer House is one of the six 18th-century stone houses owned by Historic Huguenot Street. It was altered in various points in its approximately 250 years of occupancy. Its most recent major alterations occurred in 1943 when it was purchased by Rev. John Wright Follette, a direct descendant of its original builder, Hugo Freer. Over the years, the interior was modernized into a 20th-century idea of a colonial home. This structure is not currently open to the public.

=== Deyo House ===
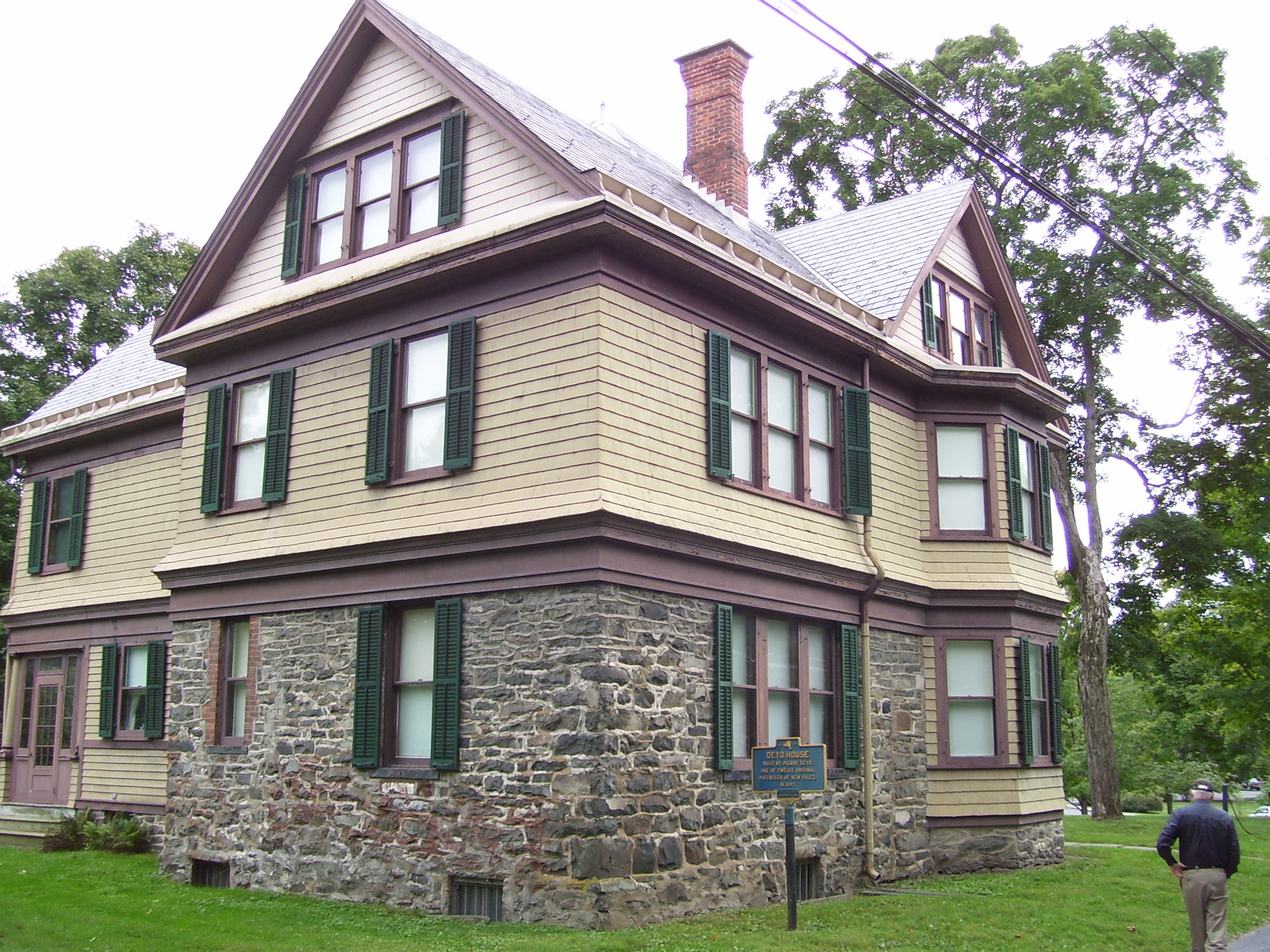
Deyo House (circa 1720) with large nineteenth century addition. Pictured 2006.

The original portion of the house was built around 1692 by Patentee Pierre Deyo. It began as a one-room house, was subsequently expanded to two rooms, and ultimately to three when a stone addition was added off the rear by Pierre's grandson Abraham Deyo Broadhead. Circumstances for this house changed dramatically when, at the height of the Colonial Revival movement, two descendants of Pierre Deyo—Abraham and Gertrude Brodhead—inherited the house. Wanting to live on the street of their ancestors but also wanting a modern, gracious home that reflected their affluence, the Brodheads partially dismantled the original stone house and built a grand Queen Anne home around it in 1894. They also significantly changed their surrounding property, in essence changing a small, village farm into a handsomely appointed and landscaped mini-estate. The house first passed out of Deyo family ownership in 1915. It was a private home until 1971, when it was purchased by the Deyo Family Association and donated in order to be opened to the public as a house museum. The home was most recently restored in 2003 and features circa 1915 interiors.

=== Crispell Memorial Walloon Church ===
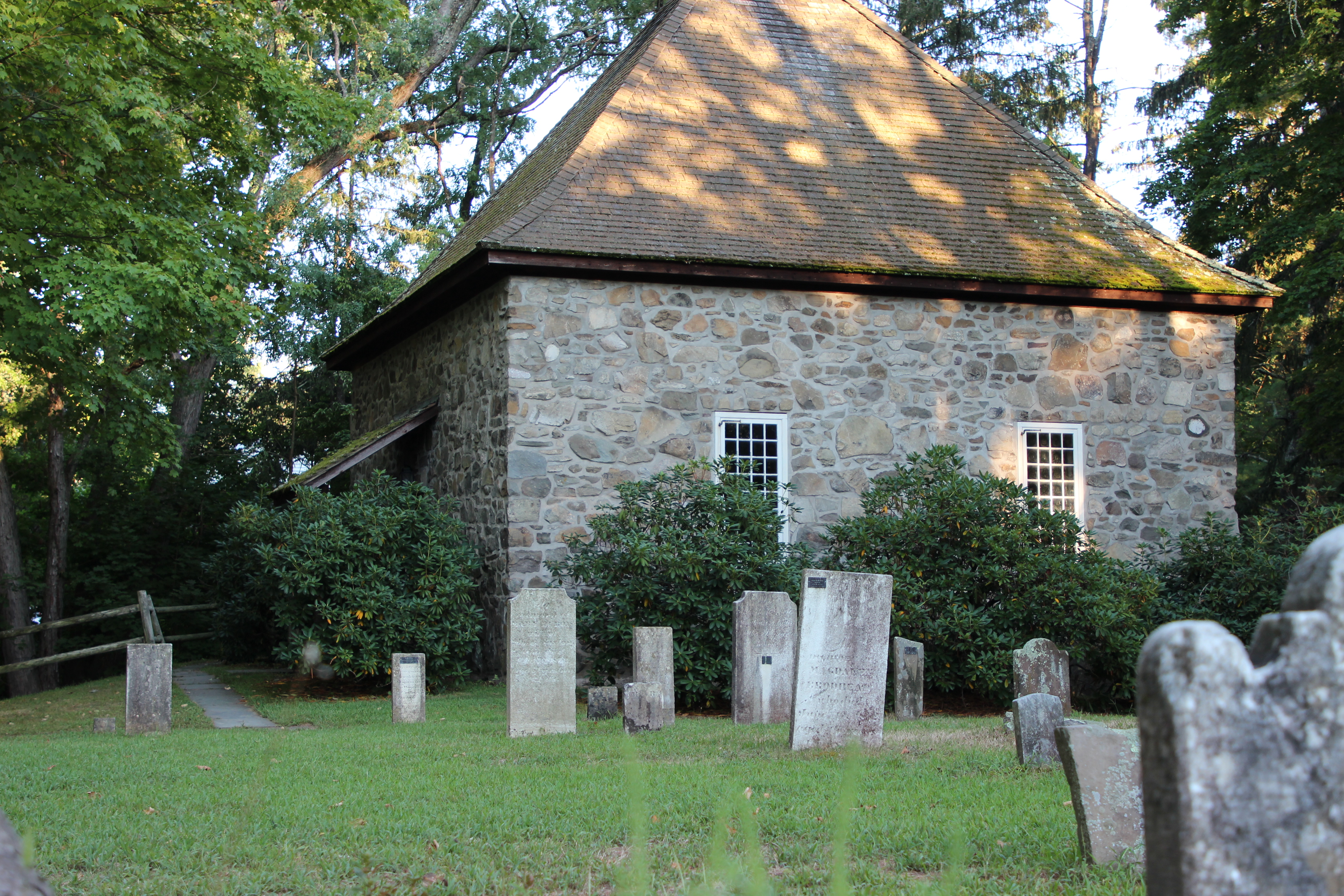
Reconstructed Walloon Reformed Church of 1717, and burying ground.

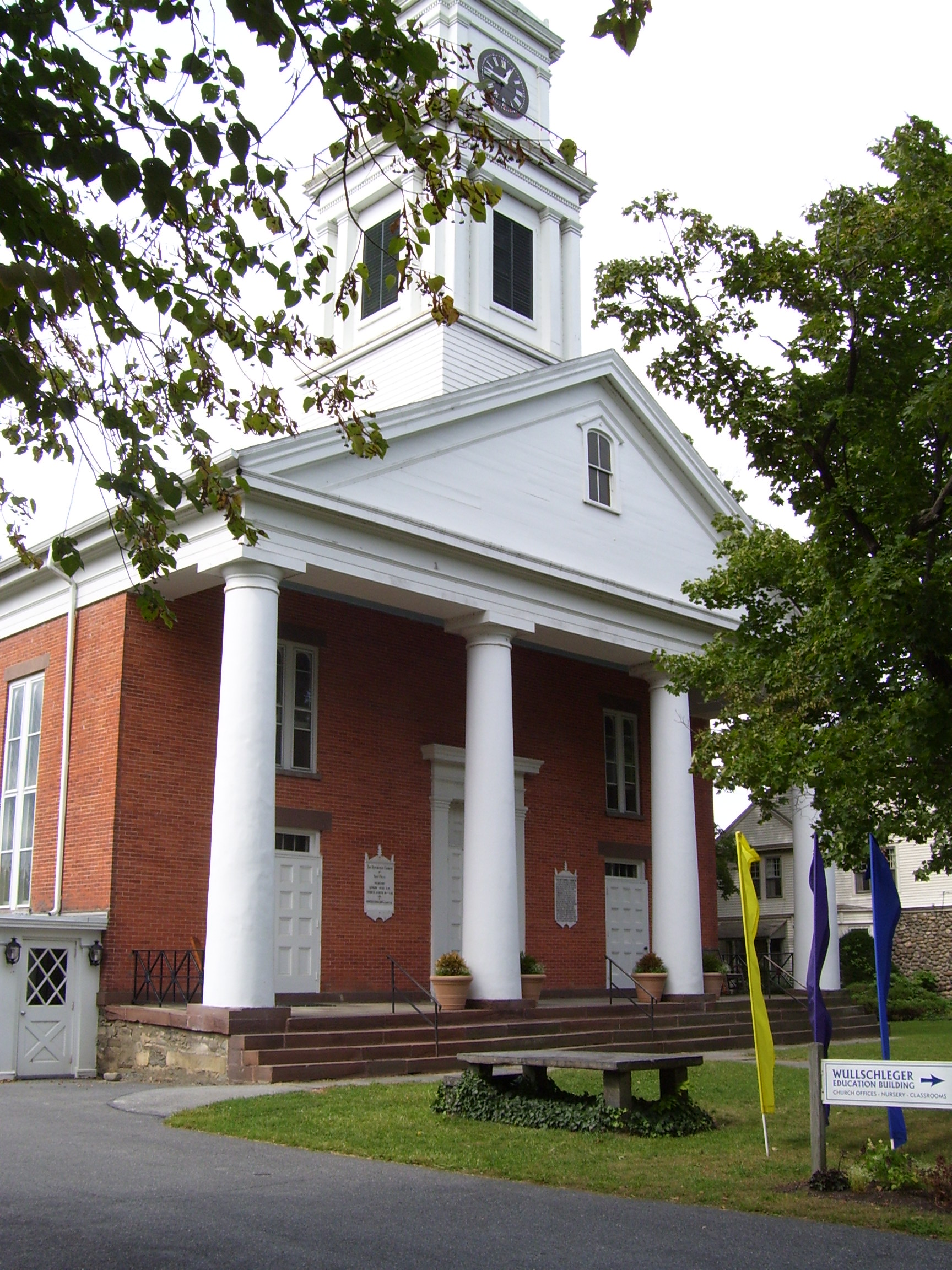
Current (1839) church building used by the Reformed congregation founded in 1678

Since the community's founding, there have been four sanctuaries built on what is today called Huguenot Street. The French-speaking Protestants who settled New Paltz built their first church in 1683—a simple log building. This was replaced in 1717 with a straightforward, square stone building that reflected the permanence of the settlement. The existing building in the burying ground is a highly conjectural reconstruction of the 1717 building near its original location.

As the New Paltz community increased in size throughout the 18th century, a larger church became necessary. A second stone church was built down the street in 1772. When it became too small, it was demolished and replaced by a third church built in 1839. This church survives today and is home to an active Reformed congregation.

The reconstructed church is named in honor of Antoine Crispell, one of the twelve founders or patentees of New Paltz. It was built as the result of a fundraising campaign led by the Crispell Family Association. The Crispell Family Foundation opted to create this reconstructed church in their ancestor's honor. It was completed in 1972.

The 1717 church was designed to reflect Reform thinking: the pulpit was placed in a central location, and the pews were placed so that everyone could see and hear more equally. This expressed the concept that each person had a direct relationship with God, rather than one mediated through a church hierarchy.

=== LeFevre House ===
Built in 1799 by Ezekiel Elting, a prosperous merchant who was born in the Bevier-Elting House, this stone and brick building is quite different from the earlier stone houses on Huguenot Street. Its Georgian-style architecture reflects the transition of New Paltz from a French and Dutch settlement to an Anglo-American community, and increasing refinement in architecture in this period as settlements matured. The house shows the changes in architectural style from the early 18th century. This house reflects the several changes in the society and home life of New Paltz in the early 19th century.

=== Deyo Hall ===
Formerly a glass factory, Deyo Hall is the site of event and meeting facilities and public restrooms. Collections storage is also housed in this building.

=== Roosa House Library and Archives ===
Located in the Roosa House, the Library and Archives at Historic Huguenot Street is a research facility devoted primarily to the history and genealogy of the Huguenot and Dutch Settlers of the Hudson Valley. It also functions as a general repository for local history, regardless of ethnicity or religious persuasion. The collections consist of family genealogies, church, cemetery and bible records, wills and deeds, census records, genealogical periodicals, county histories, and publications relating to Huguenot ancestry. Genealogists, local historians, and other interested parties can access the collections by appointment. The colorful paint replicates the original colors of the house in 1891.

=== Native American presence on Huguenot Street ===
Historians and archeologists have learned more about the continuing relations between the Esopus, the original inhabitants of the area, and the Huguenots. Some results of research can be found at the HHS site at "Relations between the Huguenots of New Paltz, NY and the Esopus Indians. The "Before Hudson" exhibit, currently on view at the DuBois Fort Visitor Center, shows some of the highlights of archaeological excavation in the area, with artifacts dating back 6,000-8,000 years ago.

=== Slavery in New Paltz ===
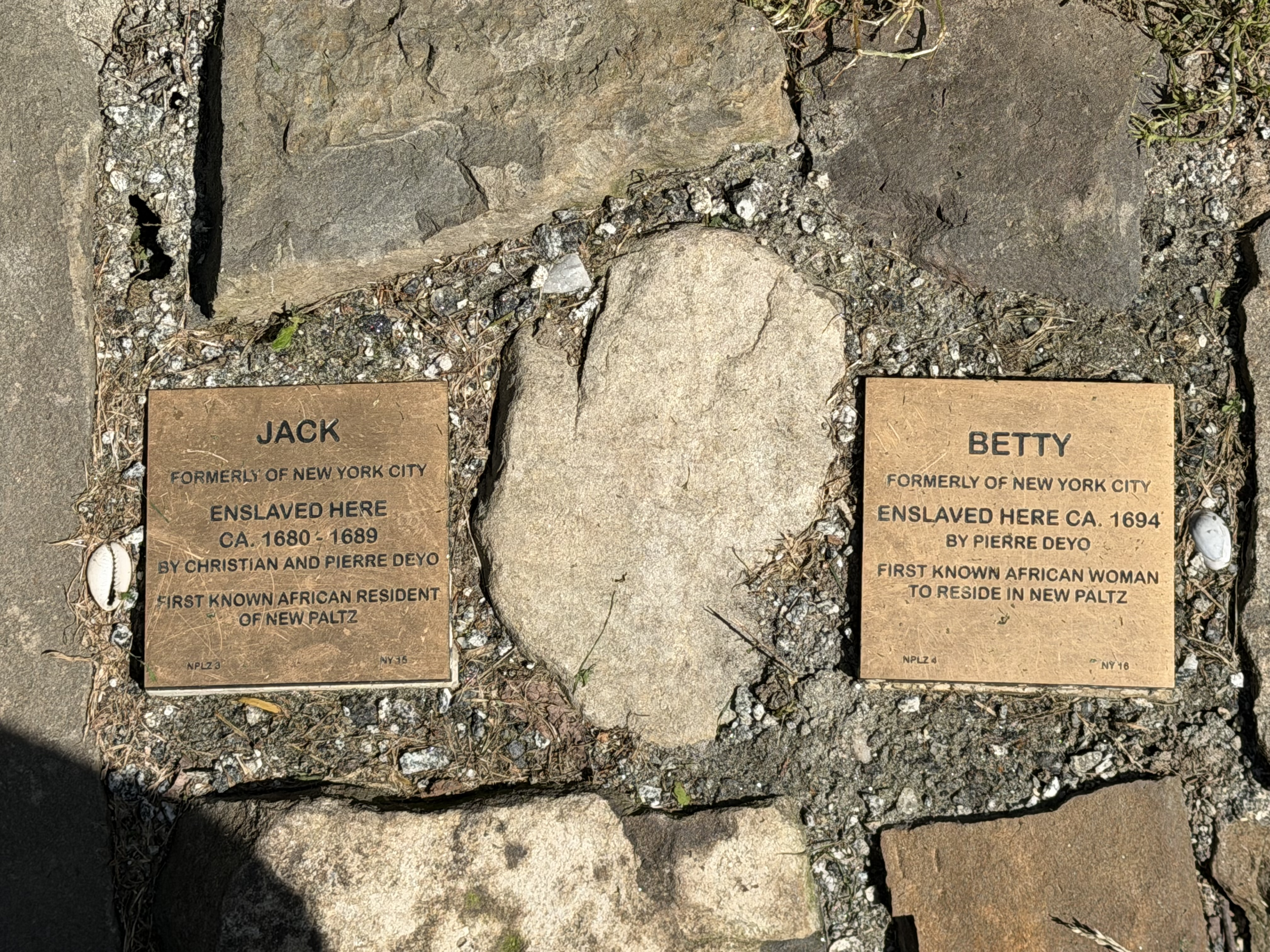
The first known African residents of New Paltz, "Jack" and "Betty."

The historical record of slavery in New Paltz begins in 1674, three years before its founding, when Louis DuBois purchased two African slaves at a public auction held in Kingston (then called Esopus). The two slaves ran away the following spring and were captured in the colony by Lewis Morris of Barbados. From 1675 to 1680, Morris and DuBois engaged in a lengthy custody battle for the two slaves.

On July 5, 1680, Christian Deyo purchased an enslaved African named "Jack" for ƒ1,160. "Jack" became the first enslaved individual and first Black resident in New Paltz. In 1694, Pierre Deyo purchased an African woman named "Betty." The interpretation boards in front of the Deyo House show receipts of the purchases in French.

Settlers continued to buy slaves to serve as laborers in New Paltz to support the settlement's growth. Throughout the next 125 years, historical records of the settlement included references to slaves. In 1703, the population included nine slaves out of a total of 130 residents. Jean and Jacob Hasbrouck owned several slaves; they were named in Jean's will as "Gerritt," "James," and "Molly." By 1755, slavery was a well-established part of the New Paltz community: the census from that year lists 28 slave holders, who collectively owned 78 slaves over the age of 14 years. The majority of slave holders (82%) owned between one and four slaves, and used them as domestic servants and farm laborers.

The overall population of New Paltz grew rapidly to 2,309 in 1790, by when 77 slave holders owned a total of 302 slaves, or 13% of the population.

== See also ==
- Major Jacob Hasbrouck Jr. House, home built by Jean Hasbrouck's grandson, which is located farther up Huguenot Street.

== External reading ==
- "The Society of Negroes Unsettled": The History of Slavery in New Paltz, NY
- The Missing Chapter: Untold Stories of the African-American Presence in the Mid-Hudson Valley
