= Josiah Hasbrouck =

American politician (1755–1821)

Member of the U.S. House of Representatives from New York's 7th district
- In office March 4, 1817 – March 3, 1819
- Preceded by: Samuel Betts
- Succeeded by: Jacob H. De Witt
- In office April 28, 1803 – March 3, 1805
- Preceded by: John Cantine (elect) (Note: Cantine was elected in 1802 to represent the newly-redrawn 7th district, but he declined to take his seat.)
- Succeeded by: Martin G. Schuneman

Member of the New York State Assembly from Ulster County
- In office July 1, 1805 – June 30, 1806
- In office July 1, 1801 – June 30, 1802
- In office July 1, 1796 – June 30, 1797

Personal details
- Born: March 5, 1755 New Paltz, New York
- Died: March 19, 1821 (aged 66)
- Party: Democratic-Republican
- Spouse: Sarah Decker (m. 1785)

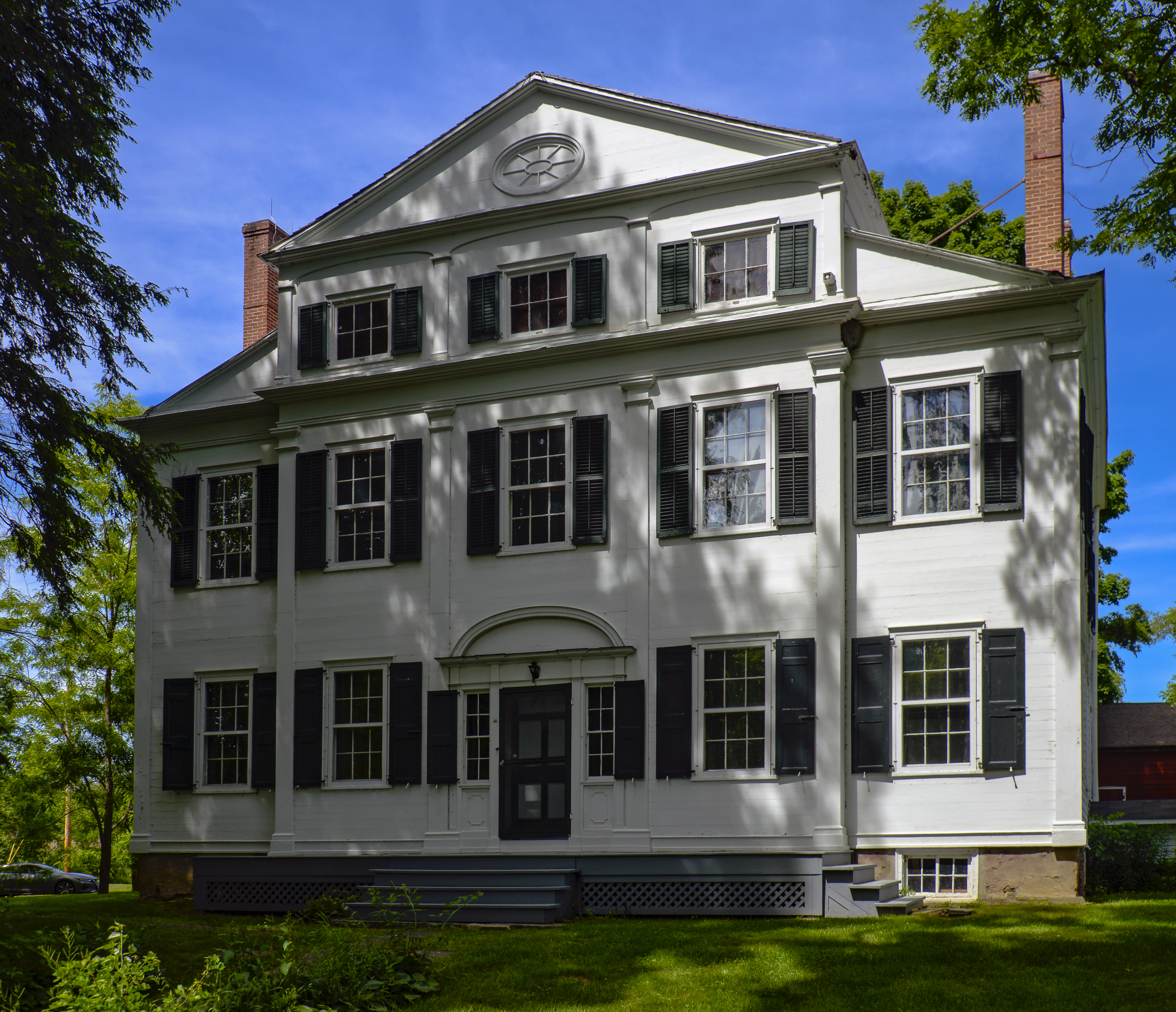
Locust Lawn, Hasbrouck's home

Josiah Hasbrouck (March 5, 1755 – March 19, 1821) was a United States representative from New York. Born in New Paltz, he completed preparatory studies and conducted a general merchandising business. He was a second lieutenant in the Third Regiment of Ulster County Militia in 1780, and was supervisor of New Paltz from 1784 to 1786 and in 1793, 1794, and 1799 to 1805. He was a member of the New York State Assembly during its 1796, 1797, 1802, and 1806 sessions.

Hasbrouck was elected as a Democratic-Republican to the Eighth Congress to fill the vacancy caused by the resignation of John Cantine and served from April 28, 1803, to March 3, 1805. He engaged in agricultural pursuits, and was then elected to the Fifteenth Congress (March 4, 1817 – March 3, 1819), during which he was chairman of the Committee on Expenditures in the Department of State. He died near Plattekill. Original interment was in the family burial ground; reinterment was in New Paltz Rural Cemetery, New Paltz.

Locust Lawn, his Federal style-home during his last years, is on the National Register of Historic Places, located along NY 32 in what is today the town of Gardiner, just south of New Paltz. The house, which is owned and operated as a house museum by [the Locust Grove Estate] boasts an outstanding collection of original furnishings and interior mouldings, and is open to the public on weekends from June through October.

== Personal life ==
Josiah was the son of Major Jacob Hasbrouck Jr. (1727–1806) and his wife, Jannetje DuBois Hasbrouck (1731–1807). His father commanded an Ulster County, New York regiment in the Revolutionary War, and served as the Supervisor of the town of New Paltz from 1762 to 1765 and again from 1771 to 1776. On his father's side of the family, he descends from three of the 12 New Paltz Patentees, or founders: Jean Hasbrouck, Christian Deyo and Louis Bevier. On his mother's side, he descends from another patentee, Louis DuBois (Huguenot), as well as Claes Martenszen Roosevelt, the earliest American ancestor of United States Presidents Theodore Roosevelt and Franklin D. Roosevelt.

On February 11, 1785, in New Paltz, Josiah married Sarah Decker, a cousin of his in three different lines (Louis DuBois, Matthys Blanchan twice). They had at least five children together:

1. Jane Hasbrouck (1788–1870); she married her cousin, Colonel Joseph Hasbrouck Jr. (1781–1853) in 1809. He served as a New York State assemblyman from 1801 to 1804. They had at least nine children.
2. Elizabeth Hasbrouck (1789–1815); she married her cousin, Josiah DuBois (1781–1869), in 1805. Their daughter, Pamela DuBois (1812–1893), married her first cousin, Abner Hasbrouck (1811–1875), son of the above Jane and Joseph. He served as the Town Supervisor of Gardiner in 1853, from 1855 to 1862, and in 1871.
3. Levi Hasbrouck (1791–1861); he married his cousin Hylah Bevier (1795–1874) in 1822. They had at least six children.
4. Maria Eliza Hasbrouck (1798–1857); she married Christopher Reeve (1798–1865) in 1825; they had at least six children.
5. Ester Hasbrouck (1802–1818)

Josiah was a third cousin, once removed of Abraham Bruyn Hasbrouck, and a second cousin, once removed of Abraham J. Hasbrouck,

== Notes ==
U.S. House of Representatives
Preceded by David Thomas	Member of the U.S. House of Representatives from New York's 7th congressional district 1803–1805	Succeeded by Martin G. Schuneman
Preceded by Samuel Betts	Member of the U.S. House of Representatives from New York's 7th congressional district 1817–1819	Succeeded by Jacob H. De Witt
