= Henriette de Clercq =

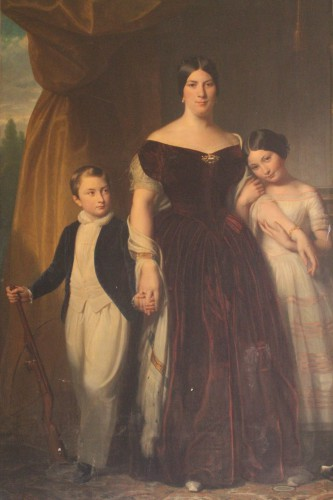
Henriette de Clercq with her two children

Henriette de Clercq (1812–1878) was a French industrialist. She was married to Louis François-Xavier de Clercq (d. 1841) and the mother of Louis de Clercq. In 1852, carbon was found on her land in Oignies, which she developed in to a lucrative industry. She became known as the great benefactor of the city of Oignies, and several memorials exist to her, among them a street named after her.
