= Alex Donner =

American band leader

- Born: Alexander Brokaw Donner; May 12, 1952; Athens, Greece
- Education: The Buckley School; Phillips Academy; Paris-Sorbonne University; Princeton University; Fordham University School of Law
- Occupations: bandleader, singer
- Years active: 1980s–present

Alexander Brokaw "Alex" Donner (born May 12, 1952) is an American band leader.

== Early life and education ==
Donner was born in Athens, Greece where his parents, Joseph Donner and Pamela Cushing, were stationed in the diplomatic service. Donner was educated at The Buckley School, Phillips Academy Andover, Paris-Sorbonne University, and Princeton University. While attending Princeton, he joined the Princeton Nassoons and formed his first band. After graduation he worked as the singer/bandleader at the New York nightclub El Morocco. After two years there he went to Fordham Law School. Donner gained experience in singing and band leadership while working under New York bandleader Lester Lanin.

== Career ==
Upon graduation, Donner joined the law firm of Saxe, Bacon & Bolan. In the mid-1980s, he worked with divorces during the week as a lawyer and performed at weddings on the weekend with his band. In 1988, he flew his orchestra to India to play the wedding of a Standard Oil heiress, whom he had represented in a previous divorce. The resultant publicity in Town and Country Magazine and on the popular television show, Lifestyles of the Rich and Famous then prompted Donner to return full-time to his first love, music.

Since that time Donner has been a full-time band and orchestra leader, performing at concerts, celebrity parties and dances. He has entertained for the wedding of Tory Burch; President George H. W. Bush; George Soros; Donald Trump; Rudy Giuliani; Tom Cruise and Katie Holmes; The Rockefeller family; Itzhak Pearlman; Kevin Kline; Lou Dobbs; Susan Lucci; Queen Noor of Jordan; the King and Queen of Sweden; the Cuomo family. Donner's cabaret show has had extended runs at both the Café Carlyle and the Oak Room of the Algonquin. His recordings have garnered Grammy entry nominations twice.

Donner and his musicians have performed with Liza Minnelli, Harry Belafonte, Tony Bennett, Natalie Cole and Jimmy Buffett, among others. Some of the venues around the United States that Alex and his band have performed at are: The Kennedy Center; many of the mansions in Newport, as well as the New York Botanical Garden. In Europe, they have played at the Palace of Versailles; Annabelle's in London; in Athens and Rome; The Guggenheim; The Metropolitan Museum of Art, The Whitney Museum; and in 2011 for the opening of the Ballyfin manor home and resort near Dublin. In 2014 he led the orchestra at the Winter Ball at The Plaza Hotel. Studio 54 was also a client that Donner served as a lawyer and as a bandleader when they needed a live band.

His company, Alex Donner Entertainment, represents a number of performers and bands, from mariachis to jazz trios and wedding bands, in addition to the Alex Donner Orchestra. As well as commercial work, the bands also perform at charity benefit concerts. Donner has also served on the board, and is currently president, of a philanthropic foundation founded by his great-grandfather, William Henry Donner.

== Personal life ==
Donner's paternal grandparents were Joseph William Donner (1894-1929) and Carroll (Elting) Donner (1904-1984). His grandfather's half-sister, Elizabeth Browning Donner, was the ex-wife of Elliott Roosevelt. His grandmother married Lionel Tennyson, 3rd Baron Tennyson following the death of his grandfather. They would divorce and his grandmother married a third time to James Moorhead Bovard (1901-1982).

His paternal great-uncle, Howard Elting Jr., was a career diplomat and Foreign Service Officer who was one of the first United States officials to be made aware of the Nazi plan to exterminate Jewish individuals in Europe. He is a descendant of many early Ulster County, New York families and settlers, including the Hasbrouck family and Louis DuBois (Huguenot).

His maternal great-grandfather is skater Irving Brokaw, and second great-grandfather is Isaac Vail Brokaw. He also descends from the founders of the Nave & McCord Mercantile Company, and Rhode Island Governor Nicholas Cooke. His great-uncle, Harry Cooke Cushing III, was married to Cathleen Vanderbilt from 1923 to 1932. His 2nd great-uncle is Otho Cushing.
