= Buckley School (New York City) =

Private school in Manhattan, New York

- School crest

Location
- 113 East 73rd Street; New York City, New York; United States; 40°46′18.4″N 73°57′44.1″W

Information
- Type: Private Independent
- Motto: Honor et Veritas (Honor and truth)
- Established: 1913
- Founder: B. Lord Buckley
- Head of school: Gregory J. O'Melia
- Grades: K-9
- Gender: Boys
- Enrollment: 374
- Colors: Blue and white
- Mascot: The Blue Demon
- Rival: Allen-Stevenson School
- Affiliations: NYSAIS
- Website: www.buckleyschool.org

Buckley School is a private, K–9 day school for boys located on the Upper East Side of Manhattan in New York City, United States.

The school has three divisions: Lower School (K–3), Middle School (4–6) and Upper School (7–9), with a student body of approximately 370 pupils and 90 faculty and staff members. The head of school is Gregory J. O'Melia, the sixth head to be appointed since the school's founding in 1913.

Buckley is a member of the National Association of Independent Schools, the New York State Association of Independent Schools and the International Boys' Schools Coalition (IBSC). Additionally, it is a charter member of the Manhattan Private Middle School League and the Metropolitan Private Middle School Track and Field Association. The school's motto is "Honor et Veritas" (Honor and Truth). Its official seal is a shield.

== History ==
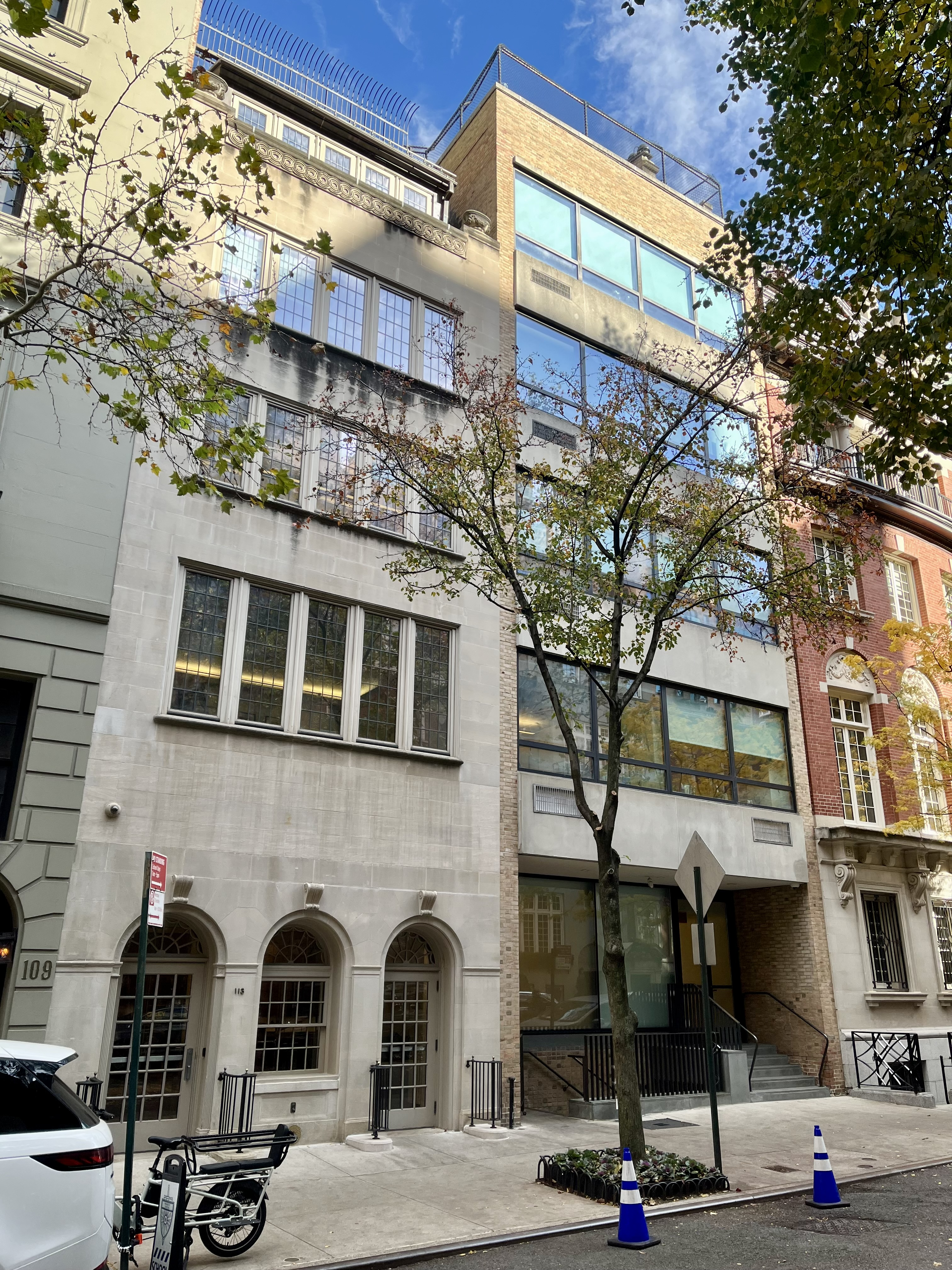
School buildings on East 73rd Street

B. Lord Buckley, a professional educator, founded Buckley in 1913 as a boys' elementary school with the aim of offering a classical curriculum. The original school was located above a milliner's shop on Madison Avenue. In 1917, the school moved to a larger building on East 74th Street. In the late 1990s, Buckley purchased a townhouse on E 73rd Street to house the Walsh building, its main school. The 74th Street Hubball building continues to be a part of the school and houses Beginners classrooms and athletic facilities. In 2014 two townhouses were purchased on E 73rd Street to serve as the school's Arts and Sciences building.

Five heads of school have succeeded B. Lord Buckley: Evelyn Adams (1932–1947), James Hubball (1947–1972), C. Brett Boocock (1972–1982), Brian Walsh (1982–2001) and its current head of school, Gregory O'Melia (2001–present).

Recent sources describe the school as being "traditional in the best sense of the word" with a formal dress code, classic curriculum, family-style lunches, and focus on both academics and boys' social development.

== Sports ==
Buckley offers a wide range of athletic activities. Cross country, football and soccer are offered in the fall; basketball, gymnastics, strength training and wrestling are offered in the winter; baseball, lacrosse and track compete in the spring.

The Buckley football team went undefeated from 2015 to 2018.

The Buckley varsity wrestling team competes in the King of the Ring Tournament every year. In 2012, they won the league championship for the 25th consecutive year. Field Day takes place at the end of the school year on Randall's Island. Boys in every class compete in traditional track races as well as events such as tug of war, sack races, egg relays and an obstacle course.

== Notable alumni ==
- D. Nelson Adams, former Managing Partner at Davis, Polk & Wardwell
- Robert L. Belknap, professor of Russian literature at Columbia University, former interim dean of Columbia College, and son of Chauncey Belknap IV (name partner of Patterson Belknap Webb & Tyler)
- Nicholas Britell, Emmy Award winning and Oscar nominated music composer
- Henry S. F. Cooper Jr., American author and journalist
- John Coumantaros, Greek-American businessman
- Christopher Nixon Cox, businessman, grandson of Richard Nixon
- A. Richard Diebold Jr., linguist
- Robert P. DeVecchi, CEO of the International Rescue Committee and Senior Fellow at the Council on Foreign Relations
- J. Richardson Dilworth, financial advisor to the Rockefeller family, Chairman of the Metropolitan Museum of Art, trustee of the Rockefeller University and Yale University, board director at Chrysler, Macy's, Squibb Corporation, and other companies
- Terry Dobson (aikidoka), American aikido pioneer and co-founder of Bond Street Dojo
- Alex Donner, American band leader
- Charles M. Fair, neuroscientist
- Charles B. Finch, attorney and business executive
- Henry Leroy Finch Jr., American philosopher
- Arthur Gibb, Republican Vermont state senator and representative
- S. Parker Gilbert, chairman and President of Morgan Stanley, son of Seymour Parker Gilbert, Assistant Secretary of the Treasury under US Presidents Woodrow Wilson & Warren G. Harding and Ambassador to Germany
- Prosser Gifford, American historian
- David Hawkings, American journalist
- John Heminway, American filmmaker and author
- J. Tomilson Hill, Blackstone Vice Chairman, Lehman Brothers CEO & Billionaire
- Warren Hoge, journalist and London bureau chief of The New York Times
- Thomas Hoving, seventh director of the Metropolitan Museum of Art
- Baird Jones, night-club promoter and contributor to tabloids
- Thomas Keating, monk and pioneer in contemplative prayer
- Andrew Mellon Laughlin, grandson of William Larimer Mellon Sr.
- Robert E. Lee IV, great grandson of Robert E. Lee
- John V. Lindsay, Mayor of New York and US Congressman
- Peter Livanos, shipping tycoon and majority owner of The Aston Martin Automobile Company
- Winston Lord, United States diplomat and leader of non-governmental foreign policy organizations; served as Special Assistant to the National Security Advisor, Director of the State Department Policy Planning Staff, President of the Council on Foreign Relations, Ambassador to China, and Assistant Secretary of State (1993–1997)
- Gerald D. Morgan, special counsel to President Eisenhower
- John Jay Mortimer, American financier, descendant of John Jay, and member of the prominent Mortimer family of New York
- Archer Mayor, author
- Nick McDonell, author
- William G. McKnight, Jr., son-in-law of T. J. Oakley Rhinelander, partner at Eastman Dillon, and pioneer in oil tanker and oil pipeline financing
- John McPheters, founder and CEO of Stadium Goods
- Justin Muzinich, United States Deputy Secretary of the Treasury
- John Negroponte, US Deputy Secretary of State, US Director of National Intelligence, US Ambassador to the United Nations, Ambassador to Iraq, Philippines, Mexico and Honduras
- Nicholas Negroponte, MIT professor and founder of MIT Media Lab, co-founder of Wired Magazine
- Addison O'Dea, documentary filmmaker
- Claiborne Pell, US Senator and Chairman of Senate Foreign Relations Committee, longest serving US Senator from Rhode Island
- Robert S. Pirie, lawyer and banker, CEO of Rothschild & Co's New York branch, bibliophile, and grandson of one of the founders of Carson Pirie Scott
- Nicholas Platt, diplomat
- Henry Varnum Poor (Yale dean), prominent diplomat, lawyer, associate dean at Yale Law School, member of the Council on Foreign Relations, and great-grandson of Henry Varnum Poor (founder of the predecessor of S&P Global Ratings)
- Sam Posey, retired racing driver, television commentator, artist
- Ogden Reid New York Herald Tribune Publisher, Ambassador to Israel under President Eisenhower, and six-term Congressman
- H. Smith Richardson, Jr., former Chairman and former President of Richardson-Vicks, Inc., former Chair of the Smith Richardson Foundation, and grandson of Lunsford Richardson (founder of Vicks Chemical Company)
- David Rockefeller, Jr., Chairman of Rockefeller Family Foundation, member of Council on Foreign Relations and philanthropist
- Mark Rockefeller, younger son of Nelson Rockefeller
- Michael C. Rockefeller, explorer & son of New York Governor & US Vice President Nelson Rockefeller
- Nelson Rockefeller, Jr., elder son of Nelson Rockefeller
- Steven Clark Rockefeller, American professor, philanthropist and a fourth-generation member of the Rockefeller family
- Elliott Roosevelt, United States Army Air Forces officer, author and a son of President Franklin D. Roosevelt (1882–1945) and First Lady Eleanor Roosevelt (1884–1962)
- Franklin Delano Roosevelt, Jr., American lawyer, politician, and businessman and fifth child of President Franklin Delano Roosevelt and First Lady Eleanor Roosevelt
- John Aspinwall Roosevelt, philanthropist and last child of U.S. President Franklin D. Roosevelt, and his wife, Eleanor Roosevelt
- William J. "Billy" Ruane Jr., Boston music promoter
- Francis Alexander Shields, businessman and father of Brooke Shields
- Jim Steyer, children's advocate, civil rights attorney, professor, author, and founder of Common Sense Media
- Tom Steyer, American billionaire, Forbes 400 member and founder of hedge fund Farallon Capital
- Charles Henry Tenney, United States district judge and grandson of Charles H. Tenney, and deputy mayor under Robert F. Wagner Jr.
- Alex Timbers, playwright, director, and producer
- Donald Trump Jr., American businessman, and son of US President Donald Trump
- Cyrus Vance Jr., New York County District Attorney & son of Cyrus Vance, Secretary of State to US President Jimmy Carter
- Oswald Garrison Villard, Jr., Stanford & Harvard Professor of Engineering, inventor, and son of Henry Villard, Thomas Edison's financial backer
- Alfred Gwynne Vanderbilt III, scion of the Vanderbilt family
- Robert F. Wagner, Jr., Deputy Mayor of the City of New York & Chairman of New York City Board of Education, son of Robert F. Wagner, Jr., mayor of New York City, and grandson of US Senator Robert Ferdinand Wagner
- William Woodward Jr., heir to the Hanover National Bank fortune and the Belair Estate, and a leading figure in racing circles
- Christopher A. Wray, 8th Director of the Federal Bureau of Investigation
- Douglas T. Yates, Jr., Rhodes Scholar, assistant professor at Yale, Trustee and Founder of The Episcopal School in the City of New York, and grandson of Herbert J. Yates (founder of Republic Pictures)
- Grant Shelby Hubley Jr., known as Whip Hubley, a former actor.
- Matthew Peter DeLuca, known as Lil Mabu, a rapper.

== In popular culture ==
- Mad Men character Pete Campbell is portrayed as an alumnus, as well as of Deerfield Academy and Dartmouth College.
- The Bonfire of the Vanities character Sherman McCoy is portrayed as an alumnus, as well as of St. Paul's and Yale.
- Succession characters Kendall Roy and Stewy Hosseini are portrayed as alumni, as well as of Harvard University.
