= Louis Du Bois (Huguenot) =

Colonist (1626–1696)

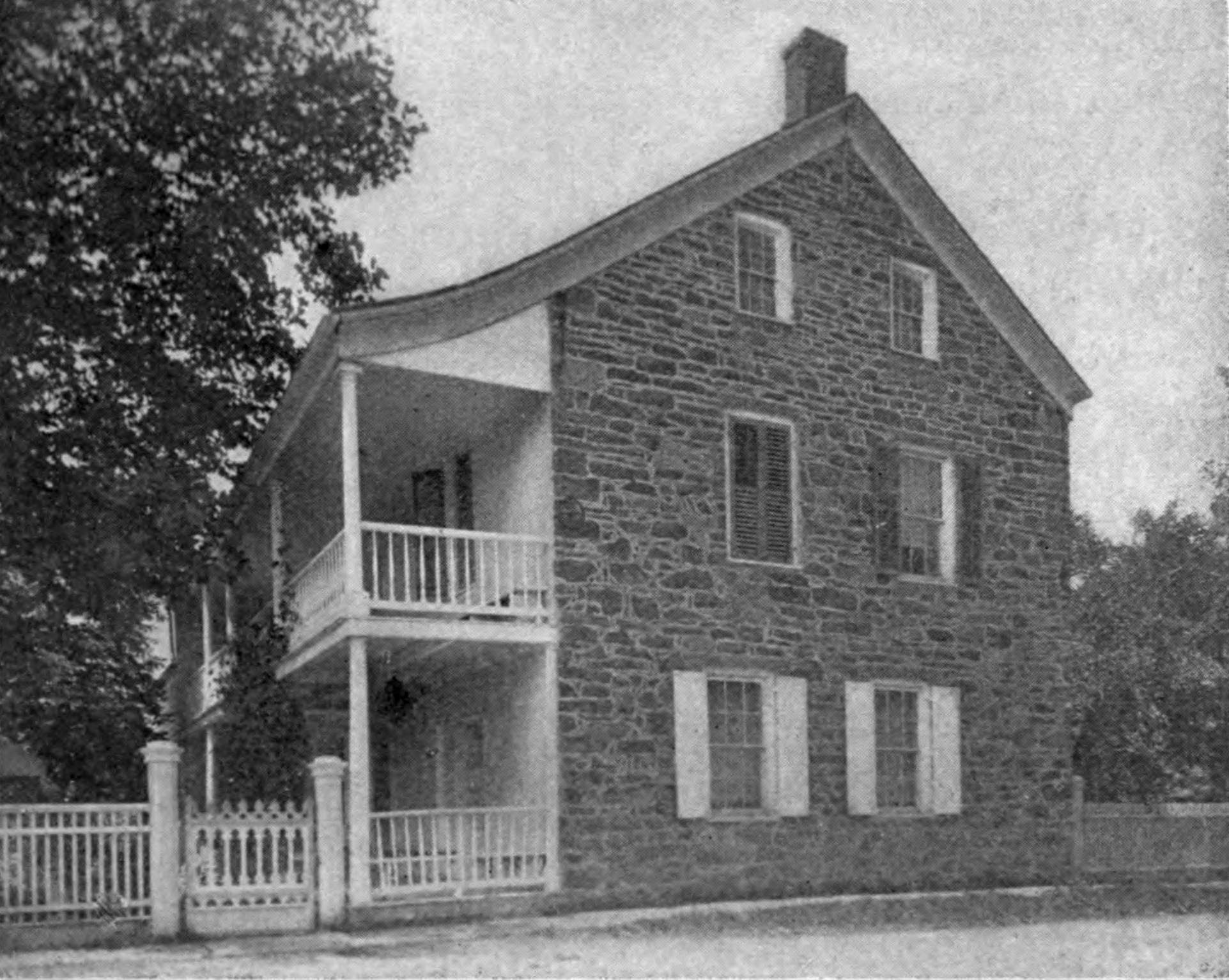
Du Bois stone "fort house" on Huguenot Street in New Paltz. Built in 1705, photographed in 1903.

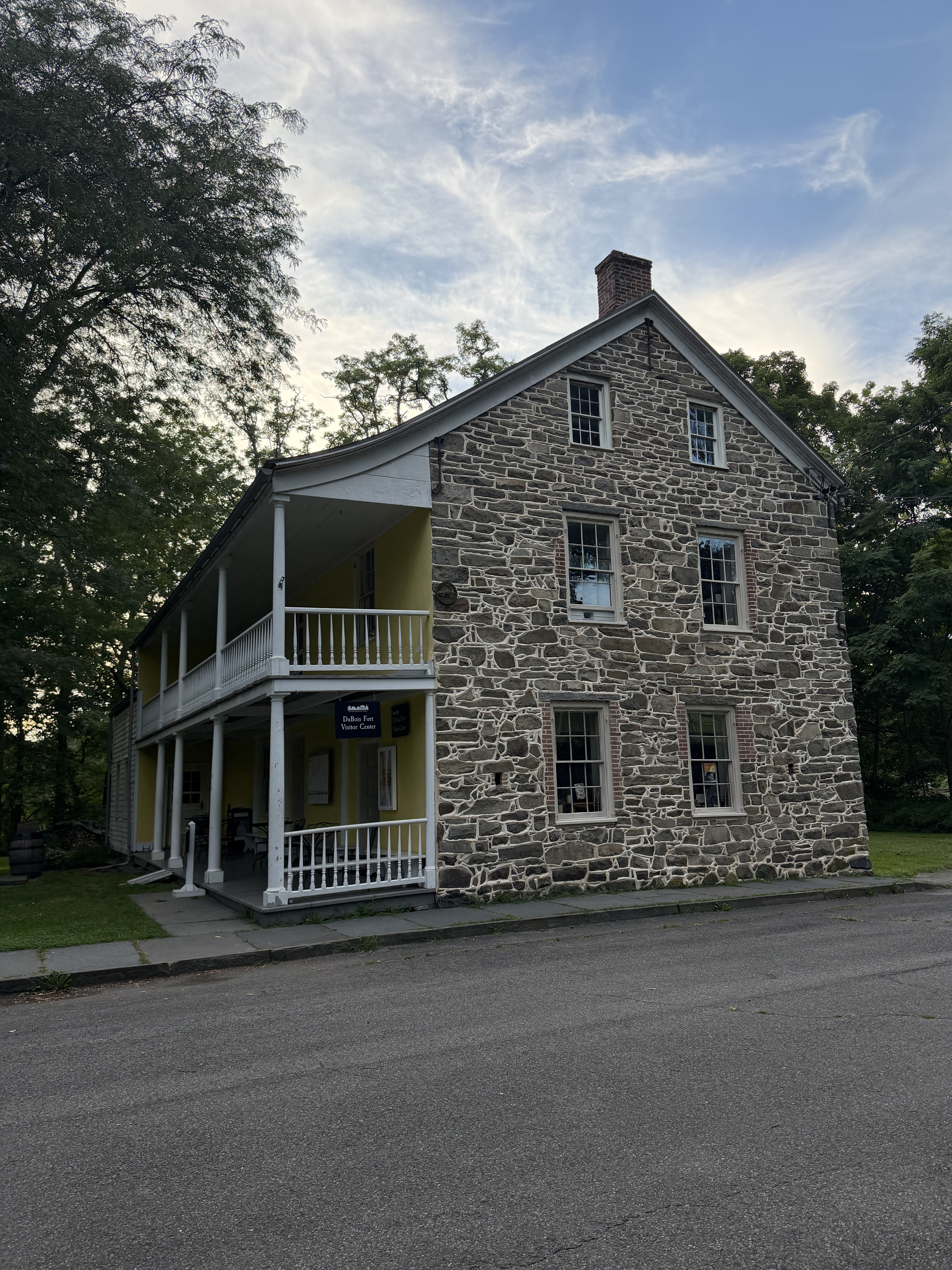
The House now serves as a visitor center and museum. Photographed in 2026.

Louis Du Bois (21 October 1626 – 1696) was a Huguenot colonist in New Netherland who, with two of his sons and nine other refugees, founded the town of New Paltz, New York. These Protestant refugees fled Catholic persecution in France, emigrating to the Rhenish Palatinate (in present-day Germany) and then to New Netherland, where they settled in Wiltwyck (present day Kingston, New York) and Nieuw Dorp (present-day Hurley, New York, settlements midway between New Amsterdam (present day New York City) and Beverwyck (today known as Albany, New York) before ultimately founding New Paltz.

== Early life ==
Coat of Arms of Louis Du Bois

Louis was the son of Chrétien du Bois and Françoise le Poivre of Wicres in Artois, and later Herlies in Romance Flanders, then part of Spanish Netherlands, today included in the Hauts-de-France region, France.

The third part of Horton, "The Memory of the Just is Blessed", begins with an extract from a document in the Archives du Nord, and commentary:

Louis du Bois fils de feu Crestien de stil couturier dem(eurant) à Herlÿ ...at par ceste vendu cede et t(ran)sporte audict Franchois du Bois ... touttes tel part droict et action quil poeut ... avoir des suscessions et hoiries à luy venu ... par les trepas dudict Crestien son père et de Franchoise le Poivre sa mere ... (2E3/3572-110 (August 12, 1643)). On this day in 1643, the future Patentee sold his interest in his parents' estate to his uncle "Franchois du Bois fils de feu Anthoine dem(eurant) à Wicre" (for 3,600 livres parisis). Ibid. Although he was already a 'dressmaker' by profession ("de stil couturier"), he would have been on that date, according to our tradition, aged merely 16 years. The reader is justifiably struck by the singularity of this professional status and contractual capacity at such a tender age. There is no suggestion of record, for example, that he was operating under any tutelage or guardianship in this sale of his birthright. Nor does it indicate that Louis was merely a couturier's "apprentice" or the like. When presented with the new evidence from Lille, readers will likely agree that American traditions regarding the birthdates of the three known Huguenot children of Chrétien du Bois — Louis, Françoise, and Jacques — should be revisited, and, perhaps, accordingly revised.

The article seemingly demonstrates that the christening recorded 21 Oct 1626 at Wicres refers to Toussaint du Bois, not his brother Louis. Louis du Bois and his (apparent twin) brother Antoine were christened at Wicres 17 Jun 1622. Louis and Antoine appear to have been named after their paternal grandfather and great-grandfather.

The article is written in Picard which is the native language of Romance Flanders (including Walloon Flanders in Belgium nowadays). It is unrelated to Flemish Dutch spoken further west that is one of the three national languages of Belgium, together with French and German and a non official language in French Westhoek. The various Dutch dialects spoken in Belgium and in France contain a number of lexical and grammatical features which distinguish them from standard Dutch. Crestien translates to Guislain (or Ghislain), and formal records were usually kept in Latin, as the Flanders region was then governed as the Spanish Netherlands. de stil Couturier above can be translated as "fashion designer" and a member of the wool supply trade at that time as Guislains lands were sold. His titleage was sold at a later date. In those days, wool was gold.

== Refugee from religious persecution ==
Louis du Bois fled persecution in France to Mannheim before 1650. He married Catherine Blanchan in Mannheim on October 10, 1655.

== Family ==
Louis and Catherine had at least eleven children:

1. Abraham Du Bois (1657–1731), who was also a New Paltz Patentee. He married Margaret Deyo, daughter of Christian Deyo, another New Paltz Patentee.
2. Isaac Du Bois (1659–1690), who was also a New Paltz Patentee. He married Maria Hasbrouck, daughter of Jean Hasbrouck II, another New Paltz Patentee, and his wife Anne Deyo, daughter of Christian Deyo.
3. Jacob Du Bois (1661–1745), married Gerritje Nieuwkirk
4. Sarah Du Bois (1664–1726), married Joost Jansen Van Meteren
5. David Du Bois (1667–1715), married Cornelia Vernooy
6. Solomon Du Bois (1669–1759), married Tryntje Gerritsen Foochen
7. Rebecca Du Bois (1671-by 1713)
8. Rachel Du Bois (1675-by 1713)
9. Louis Du Bois Jr. (1677–1749), married Rachel Hasbrouck. She was the daughter of Abraham Hasbrouck, another New Paltz Patentee and his wife, Maria Deyo, daughter of Christian Deyo.
10. Mattheus Du Bois (1679–1748), married Sara Van Keuren.
11. Magdalena Du Bois (1680-by 1713)

== New Netherland immigration ==
Du Bois and his family moved to Wiltwyck, within New Netherland, around 1660, then to Hurley, New York. In 1663 the Esopus Indians captured Du Bois' wife Catherine and three children, who were rescued three months later. According to legend, but unmentioned in the detailed journal of the rescue expedition's commander, Catherine Du Bois was singing the Psalm 137 about the Babylonian captivity when they were rescued. Louis Du Bois was also physically attacked by the Indians, but fought back and survived.

== New Paltz patentee ==
Du Bois and others bought a 40,000-acre tract of land from the Esopus Indians in 1677. The tract, known in 17th-century colonial New York as a "patent," stretched from the Hudson River to the Shawangunk Mountains. Du Bois was one of eleven men to begin settling on a rise over the Wallkill River, in the center of the patent, in 1678. He served as one of the original elders in New Paltz's French Reformed Church, which is still in existence today.

In the early years, Du Bois and his fellow patentees governed the land communally. In 1728, the surviving patentees and their descendants created a more formal form a government called "The Twelve Men" (later known as the Duzine). This body consisted of one elected representative for each patentee families. Membership was restricted to their descendants through either male or female lines. To this date, some of the Du Bois land is still owned by family descendants. In 1785, the New York State Legislature confirmed the actions of this body. Although a standard form of town government was established in the late 18th century, the Duzine existed in at least ceremonial form into the 19th century. In the later years of the Duzine, the members were consumed with lawsuits defending the boundaries of the New Paltz patent. At one time, the Duzine hired Aaron Burr to represent them in such a lawsuit.

== Final days ==
Du Bois himself eventually returned to Wiltwyck, by then known as Kingston, where he died prior to his will being granted probate on June 23, 1696. His widow remarried, and in her will freed two of her slaves.

== Legacy ==
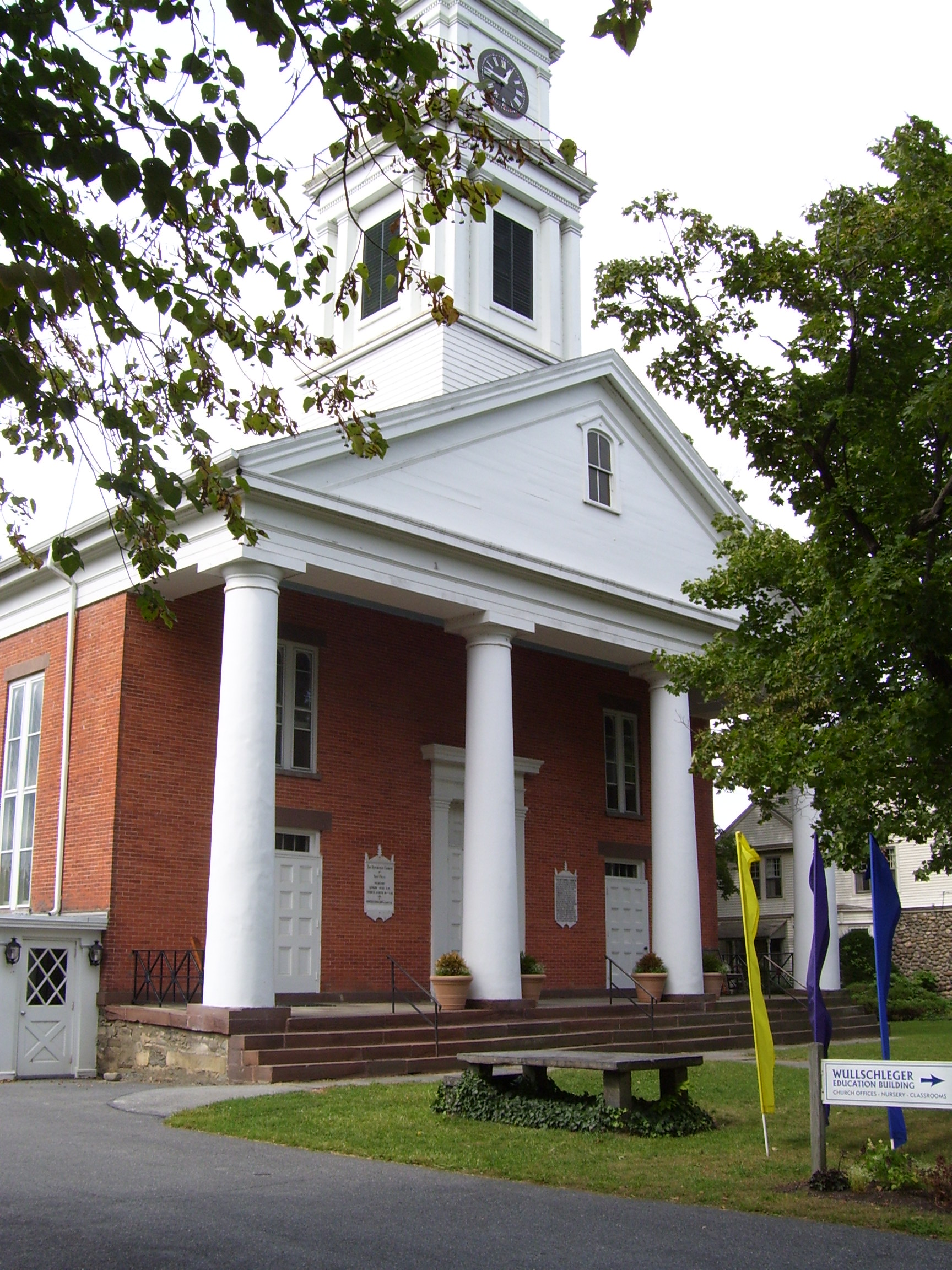
Reformed church in New Paltz. Du Bois co-founded the congregation and served as an elder.

The original settlement of Louis Du Bois and his fellow patentees survives today as Historic Huguenot Street, a National Historic Landmark District. The site includes the DuBois Fort, a colonial stone house built by one of Louis' sons.

W. E. B. Du Bois is a descendant of Louis in the eighth generation. Most of his descendants supported the revolution, though, and now, descendants of the family's "French father" can be found in every state of the union and in Canada.

Some of the notable descendants of Louis Du Bois include:

- Cleve Benedict, U.S. Congressman from West Virginia
- Roeliff Brinkerhoff, lawyer and editor
- Marlon Brando, screen and stage actor
- Billy Bush, radio and television host, member of the Bush family.
- Jonathan S. Bush, technology entrepreneur, member of the Bush family.
- Johnny Carson, television personality
- Mary Cassatt, painter and printmaker
- Washington Irving Chambers, U.S. Navy Captain and "the Father of Naval Aviation"
- Joan Crawford, screen and stage actress and model
- Charles G. DeWitt, U.S. Congressman from New York and Ambassador of the United States to Guatemala
- Henry Richard DeWitt, New York state representative and clerk of Ulster County Board of Supervisors
- Abraham A. Deyo, New York state senator
- Morton Deyo, U.S. Navy Vice Admiral
- Bill Dole, college football coach at East Carolina University and Davidson College
- Alex Donner, musician and band leader
- William Donovan III, college basketball player and high school basketball coach
- Lucas Elmendorf, New York state representative and United States Congressman from New York
- Walter F. Frear, Hawaii Supreme Court justice (1893–1907) and 3rd territorial governor of Hawaii (1907–1913)
- William Gilmer, U.S. Navy captain and naval governor of Guam
- Horton D. Haight, LDS Church (Mormon) pioneer
- David B. Haight, LDS Church (Mormon) apostle and mayor of Palo Alto, California
- Cornelius A.J. Hardenbergh, New York state representative and Shawangunk, New York supervisor
- Abraham J. Hasbrouck, U.S. Congressman from New York
- Josiah Hasbrouck, U.S. Congressman from New York
- Louis Hasbrouck, New York state assemblyman and senator
- Sol Hasbrouck, Mayor of Boise, Idaho
- Jon Huntsman Jr., U.S. diplomat and businessman, Governor of Utah
- Jacob LeFever, U.S. Congressman from New York
- Frank J. LeFevre, U.S. Congressman from New York
- Jay Le Fevre, U.S. Congressman from New York
- William Lounsbery, U.S. Congressman from New York and second mayor of Kingston, New York
- Gavin Newsom, Governor of California
- Darren O'Day, Major League Baseball pitcher for the New York Yankees
- George S. Patton, U.S. Army general
- Vernon Dubois Penner Jr., U.S. diplomat and Ambassador to Cape Verde
- Winfield Scott Schley, U.S. Navy admiral
- George H. Sharpe, U.S. Army general and New York State Assemblyman and Speaker
- Henry Granville Sharpe, U.S. Army general
- Trudy Stevenson, Zimbabwean politician and ambassador
- Fred Upton, U.S. Congressman from Michigan
- Kate Upton, actress and Sports Illustrated model
- John Monroe Van Vleck, mathematician and astronomer
- Edward Burr Van Vleck, mathematician
- John Hasbrouck Van Vleck, physicist, mathematician and 1977 Nobel Prize in Physics winner
- Van Vechten Veeder, New York State District Judge
- Theodoric R. Westbrook, U.S. Congressman from New York
- Brodie Van Wagenen, sports agent and former New York Mets general manager
- Gertrude Van Wagenen, biologist
- Jeff Van Wagenen, pro golfer and businessman
- Sam Walton, founder of Walmart and Sam's Club
- Daniel D.W., artist and author
