= Bradley-Martin Ball =

1897 costume ball held in New York City

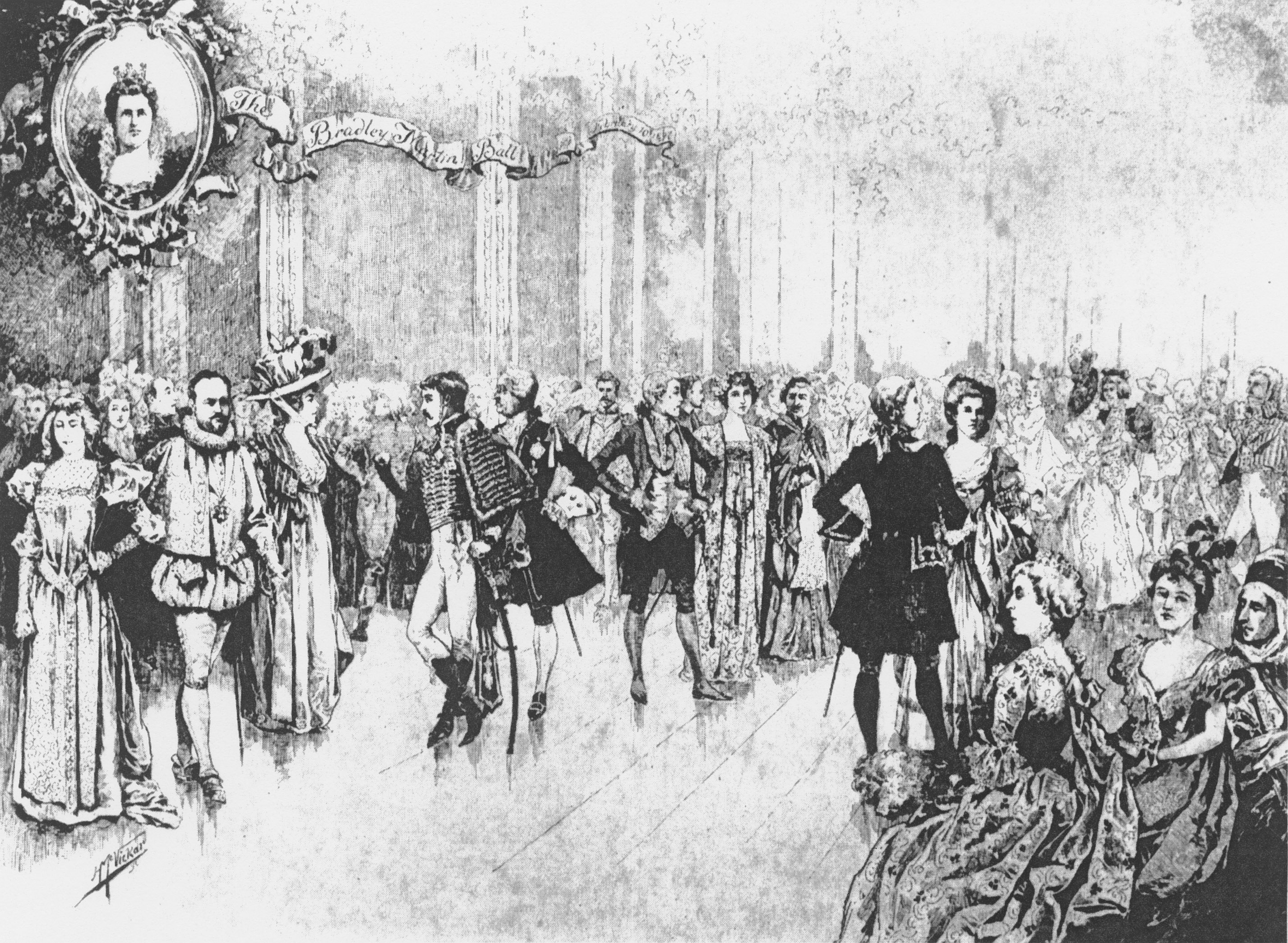
The Bradley Martin Ball by Harry Whitney McVickar

The Bradley Martin Ball was a lavish costume ball held at the original Waldorf Hotel in New York City on the night of February 10, 1897. Cornelia Martin, wife of Bradley Martin, organized the ball. In the style of the day, the couple were known as “the Bradley Martins” and Cornelia styled as “Mrs. Bradley Martin” (no hyphen) to distinguish them from other Mr. and Mrs. Martins in polite society, hence the ball became infamous as the Bradley Martin ball.

The Bradley Martins spent $369,000 (approximately $14.8 million in 2026 dollars) to throw the ball, while eight hundred socialites spent about $400,000 imitating kings and queens. In newspapers in New York and across the country, preachers and editorial writers argued over the propriety of a party that would cost hundreds of thousands of dollars while the country was in the midst of a depression. In the end, the ball was a social triumph but created negative publicity.

== Before the ball ==
The Martins’ stated intention for throwing the ball was to create an economic stimulus for New York City, which was at the end of the Long Depression which began in 1873 and included the Panic of 1893. According to Bradley Martin’s brother, Frederick:

One morning at breakfast my brother remarked–

“I think it would be a good thing if we got up something; there seems to be a great deal of depression in trade; suppose we send out invitations for a concert.”

“And pray, what good will that do?” asked my sister-in-law, “the money will only benefit foreigners. No, I’ve a far better idea; let us give a costume ball at so short notice that our guests won’t have time to get their dresses from Paris. That will give an impetus to trade that nothing else will.”

In the three weeks leading up to the ball, New York society made the ball its one topic of discussion. The Commercial Advertiser exclaimed: "There is a great stir today in fashionable circles and even in public circles. The cause of it all is the Bradley Martin ball, beside which the arbitration treaty, the Cuban question, and the Lexow investigation seem to have become secondary matters of public interest."

== The ball ==
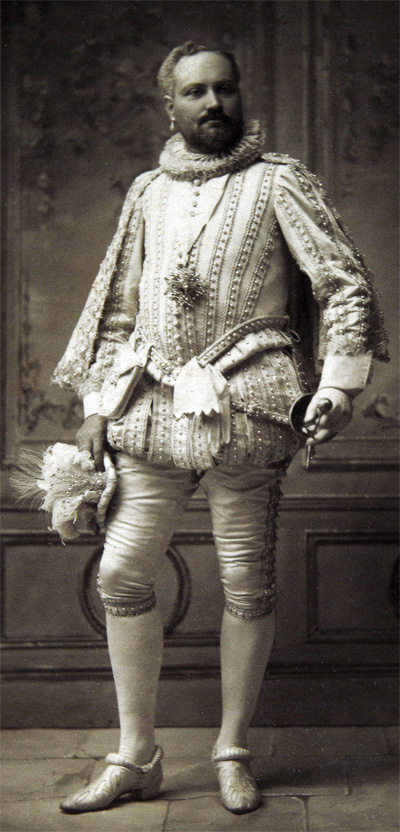
James L. Breese dressed as the Duke of Guise in white corded silk with embroidery of pearls and silver lace.

=== Preparations ===
Florist Small was in charge of the decorations for the Bradley Martin ball. Decorating the Waldorf began on the morning of February 9 by A.W. Merritt, Small's colleague. In the days leading up to the event, dealers’ stocks and household stores were ransacked to supply the demand for ornaments and historical accuracy. All the jewelers who dealt in antiques were cleaned out of all they had on hand. Jewels held as heirlooms by the old families of New York were taken from safety vaults. Laces that had been locked away in family chests or in safe deposit vaults for long years had been retrieved.

Twelve hundred invitations were issued for the event, and more than half of those invited were in attendance. Some who came also left early, seeming to have made an appearance out of curiosity.

=== The Waldorf ===
"The interior of the Waldorf-Astoria Hotel was transformed into a replica of Versailles, and rare tapestries, beautiful flowers and countless lights made an effective background for the wonderful gowns and their wearers."

Police officers stood guard at the entrance to the Waldorf. The Bradley Martins arrived first at 10:15 pm. At half past 10 a group of carriages arrived. Before 11 the stream of guests had become continuous. The guests were ushered into the Waldorf, where they ascended to the corridors on the second floor, where 15 dressing rooms were available for the use and comfort of the guests.

Some guests, preferring not to expose themselves on the street while wearing tempting fortunes in jewels and laces, changed into their costumes at this point. This wasn't done through any feeling of fear, but merely as a wise precaution. Wigmakers and make-up artists were available in these rooms. When leaving the dressing rooms the guests headed to the smaller ballroom. It was here where Cornelia Martin received her guests. A lackey announced the guests’ names and the characters they impersonated to her. This stream of guests poured by her for nearly 90 minutes and it was after midnight before she was able to enter the main ballroom to take her place in the opening quadrille d’honneur.

=== Costumes ===
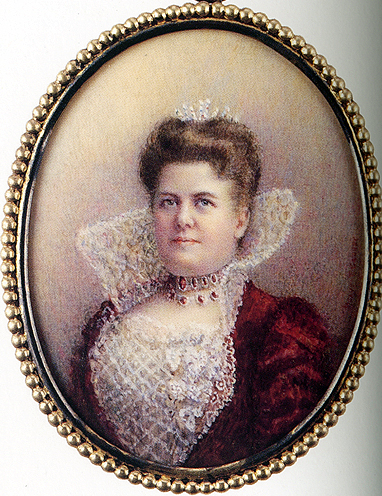
A Cameo of Cornelia Martin dressed as Mary Stuart, Queen of Scots, for the Ball.

Cornelia Martin requested her guests to pick something from the 16th, 17th, or 18th century, and some came dressed as George Washington, a Japanese nobleman, an Egyptian princess and Pocahontas. A list was compiled and published in the New York Times three days prior to the event, listing guests and the historical characters they were going to impersonate and what costumes they were going to wear.

Martin "personated Mary Stuart, and her gold embroidered gown was trimmed with pearls and precious stones worth more than $60,000. Bradley (Martin), as Louis XV, wore a Court suit of brocade". "In many cases the diamond buttons worn by the men represented thousands of dollars, and the value of the historic gems worn by the ladies baffles description." At the time, the average income of an American was $400 a year.

Otho Cushing, a young artist from Boston, created quite a stir when he appeared as an Italian falconer's costume which consisted of full body tights, a short jacket and a cap with a stuffed falcon on one arm. "The costume left little to the imagination as far as the figure was concerned, and, although historically correct in every detail, was so decidedly pronounced that he made a sensation wherever he moved."

Other guests included Caroline Webster Schermerhorn Astor, known simply as Mrs. Astor, costumed as Mary, Queen of Scots, her son John Jacob Astor as Henry IV of France and his wife as Marie Antoinette, James L. Breese as the Duke of Guise, Charles Childs as Lady Teazle, Hermann Oelrichs as a Dutch Burgomaster, Charles Post as Madame de Maintenon, Stanford White in a court costume of black velvet and white satin, the artist Adolfo Müller-Ury as a Spanish toreador, and Hamilton Fish Webster as Maria Theresa of Austria.

=== Decorations ===
The smaller ballroom was set throughout with furniture of the Louis XV period, and the walls were hung with tapestry draperies. Roses were hurled en masse against the draperies and let remain where they landed. The side of the room, where the Hungarian band was placed, was concealed by long-stemmed roses and garlands were dropped from the center to each side and over the mirrors. The Hungarian Band, under the leadership of Carl Berlinger, played 12 concert selections, chosen by Mrs. Bradley Martin, throughout the evening.

Upon entering the grand ballroom the guests faced a wall in which 15 mirrors were imbedded. The far side of the room, the musicians’ balcony, was concealed by pink roses, with garlands hanging from above. There were over 5,000 roses and 3,000 orchids in these various groupings.

The café and the court were decorated, with a desired homelike effect. 125 tables were set up, each to accommodate six guests, with a centerpiece of Beauty roses.

=== Music ===
The danse d’honneur, arranged by Caroline Astor, opened the ball. The company was led by Cornelia Martin, in the role of the Queen, escorted by John Jacob Astor as the King. For this danse d’honneur, the orchestra played music composed by Beethoven. Following this, the orchestra started playing one of Chopin's polonaises announcing the approach of the wife of Edmund L. Baylies and her associates for the minuet.

When they formed for the minuet the orchestra struck into Mozart's dance music out of Don Giovanni. The dance of the debutantes was next, and it was livelier than the others and the most difficult of all. The members of this set, organized by the wife of Frederic Bronson, danced a Hungarian Court quadrille, the Kormagyar, in music arranged by Allen Dodworth. This quadrille ended the exhibition dances. General dancing followed the three quadrilles until supper time.

=== Entertainment and favors ===
The cotillion commenced at three, and spectators found amusement as the gentlemen danced it with swords at their sides. Swords got tangled in gowns and laces, and courtiers tripped over them, to the delight of the spectators. Elisha Dyer, Jr. led the cotillion.

Cornelia Martin selected small silver figures and a staff as “favors” for each of the guests of the ball. The "favors" were awarded by Elisha Dyer, Jr. as leader of the cotillion.

== Reaction and controversy ==
Even before the Ball took place, the Bradley Martins drew fire from all directions, as newspapers criticized its extravagance and clergymen urged their congregations not to attend. One clergyman denounced the ball by saying: "You rich people put next to nothing in the collection plate, and yet you’ll spend thousands of dollars on Mrs. Bradley Martin’s ball”.

After the ball many ministers preached against its excessive consumption and the authorities promptly raised Bradley Martin's taxes (as well as those of their friends and fellow-attendees the Astors) quite out of proportion to those paid by anyone else. The Bradley Martins returned to England, where they had owned a home for several years, and Scotland, where they leased a 65,000-acre (260 km^{2}) estate, Balmacaan.

The high-profile backlash, as detailed above, ensured that the Bradley Martin ball is perhaps best-remembered as the end of the excesses of the Gilded Age.

== See also ==
- Duchess of Richmond's ball
