= Vermont's Land Use and Development Act =

1970 law in Vermont

Act 250, Vermont's Land Use and Development Act, 10 V.S.A. § 6001 et seq., is a law passed in 1970 by the Vermont legislature designed to mitigate the effects of development through an application process that addresses the environmental and community impacts of projects that exceed a threshold in size.

== Background ==
Development pressures resulting from the opening of two interstate highways (I-89 and I-91) made access to the state much easier for year-round visitors, creating community concerns including road congestion, increased environmental problems, burden on local services, and rising taxes. Governor Deane C. Davis appointed a study commission chaired by state representative Arthur Gibb in 1969 to develop a statewide law to address these concerns, as no environmental regulations or land use controls existed. A major contributor to the construction of the law was Laura G. Wheeler, in consultation with then Vermont Attorney General James Jeffords.

== The law ==
The law created nine District Environmental Commissions to review large-scale development projects using 10 criteria that are designed to safeguard the environment, community life, and aesthetic character of the state. They have the power to issue or deny a permit to real estate developers for any project that encompasses more than 10 acres (40,000 m^{2}), or more than one acre (4,000 m^{2}) for towns that do not have permanent zoning and subdivision bylaws. The law also applies to any development project with more than 10 housing units or housing lots; and may also apply for construction proposed above 2,500 feet (760 m) of elevation. Act 250 also created the Vermont Environmental Board to review appeals coming from District Commission rulings.

=== District Commissions ===
The district commissions are:

- District 1: Rutland County
- District 2: Windham County and southern Windsor County
- District 3: northern Windsor County and Orange County
- District 4: Chittenden County
- District 5: Washington and Lamoille counties
- District 6: Franklin and Grand Isle counties
- District 7: Caledonia, Orleans and Essex counties
- District 8: Bennington County
- District 9: Addison County

=== Ten Criteria ===
The 10 Criteria are as follows:

1. Will not result in undue water or air pollution. Included are the following considerations: (A) Headwaters; (B) Waste disposal (including wastewater and stormwater); (C) Water Conservation; (D) Floodways; (E) Streams; (F) Shorelines; and (G) Wetlands.
2. Has sufficient water available for the needs of the subdivision or development.
3. Will not unreasonably burden any existing water supply.
4. Will not cause unreasonable soil erosion or affect the capacity of the land to hold water.
5. Will not cause unreasonably dangerous or congested conditions with respect to highways or other means of transportation.
6. Will not create an unreasonable burden on the educational facilities of the municipality.
7. Will not create an unreasonable burden on the municipality in providing governmental services.
8. Will not have an undue adverse effect on aesthetics, scenic beauty, historic sites or natural areas, and 8(A) will not imperil necessary wildlife habitat or endangered species in the immediate area.
9. Conforms with the Capability and Development Plan which includes the following considerations: (A) The impact the project will have on the growth of the town or region: (B) Primary agricultural soils; (C) Productive forest soils; (D) Earth resources; (E) Extraction of earth resources; (F) Energy conservation; (G) Private utility services; (H) Costs of scattered developments; (J) Public utility services; (K) Development affecting public investments; and (L) Rural growth areas.
10. Is in conformance with any local or regional plan or capital facilities program.

The 10 criteria have changed little since the adoption of Act 250 in 1970. Efforts have been made over the years to make the permitting process work more efficiently, along with performance standards. Today, the District Commissions receive between 600 and 800 applications per year, and hold hearings on an average of 20% of these. They have an approval record of 98%, but this rate includes plans modified during the hearing process, with conditions typically attached to permits when granted.

Act 250 jurisdiction attaches forever to permits, except to permits for quarries and logging at elevations over 2,500 feet (760 m). These permits are allowed to close when the work required to complete them is complete. There is not sufficient funding to support personnel to verify proper completion of the required activity, so the Act 250 office must rely on the permit applicant to truthfully verify completion.

Act 250 creators included Laura G. Wheeler of Barre Town, Vermont; then Attorney General James Jeffords, Howard Rusk of New York; Jeanne Garvin of Montpelier, Vermont; and Lawrence Gurnette of Michigan.

The intent of the Act was to create a more esthetic Vermont by protecting rivers, air, the forest's ability to support wildlife, and to preserve Vermont's natural resources. One concern was forest conservation, and the prevention of excessive clear cutting.

== Controversy ==
The law has been controversial since its implementation. It is often costly to implement restrictions placed on commercial projects.

In his 2002 gubernatorial campaign, Governor Jim Douglas ran on a platform that included restructuring Act 250.

It has been known as the "third rail" of Vermont politics. In 2023, state senator Ann Cummings argued that it has been more controversial than Vermont's civil unions law passed in 2000. She claimed that the law brought about the number one challenge Vermont faces which is whether it wants to be a "state or a theme park".

== See also ==
- United States energy law
- Green Up Day

== External links and sources ==
- ACT 250: A Guide to Vermont's Land Use Law. State of Vermont Environmental Board, Montpelier, VT (USA), November 2000.
- Times Argus news story illustrating some of the pitfalls of Act 250 and the pervasive legislative opposition to ACT 250 reforms.
