= Estrées, Nord =

Estrées
- Commune
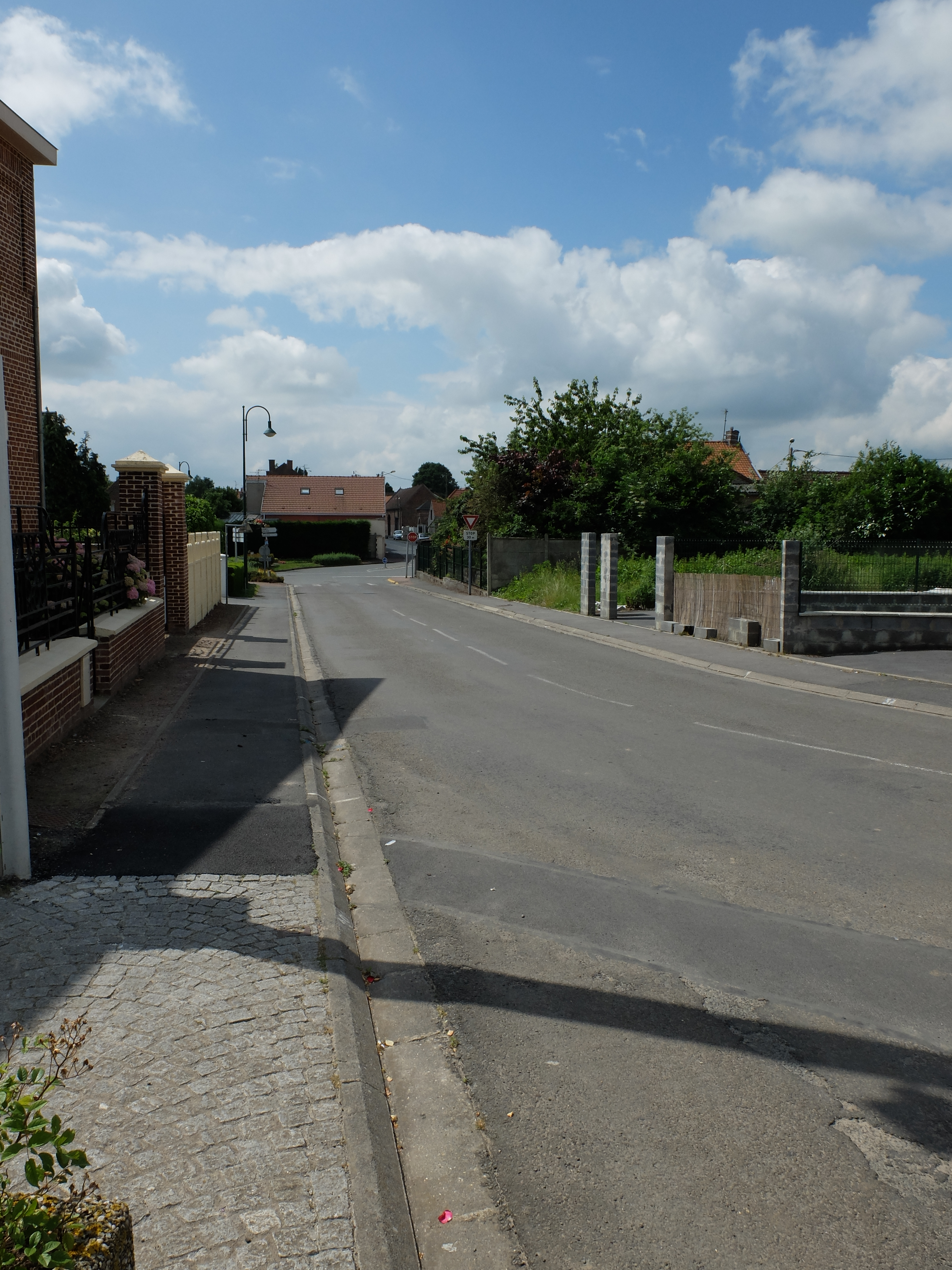
- A view within Estrées

- Coat of arms
- Location of Estrées
- Location within France Location within Hauts-de-France
- Coordinates: 50°18′03″N 3°04′14″E
- Country: France
- Region: Hauts-de-France
- Department: Nord
- Arrondissement: Douai
- Canton: Aniche
- Intercommunality: Douaisis Agglo

Government
  - Mayor (2020–2026): Lionel Blassel
- Area^{1}: 5.82 km^{2} (2.25 sq mi)
- Elevation: 86 m (282 ft)
- Highest elevation: 63 m (207 ft)
- Lowest elevation: 33 m (108 ft)
- Population (2023): 1,134
  - Density: 195/km^{2} (505/sq mi)
- Time zone: UTC+01:00 (CET)
  - Summer (DST): UTC+02:00 (CEST)
- INSEE/Postal code: 59214 /59151
- ^{1} French Land Register data, which excludes lakes, ponds, glaciers > 1 km^{2} (0.386 sq mi or 247 acres) and river estuaries.

Estrées is a commune in the Nord department in northern France.

It is one of many villages in the north of France bearing the name Estrées. The etymology of the name is from strata (cognate of English "street"), the word for the stone-layered Roman roads in the area (some of which turned into modern highways). Hence Estreti, village on the road which developed into Estrées.

== Heraldry ==
Arms of Estrées	The arms of Estrées are blazoned : Vert, a fess ermine. (Oignies, Beaucamps-Ligny, Estrées, Gruson and Wicres use the same arms.)

== See also ==
- Communes of the Nord department
