= Robert P. DeVecchi =

American nonprofit executive

- Born: October 6, 1930; New York City, New York, U.S.
- Died: October 26, 2015 (aged 85); Southport, Connecticut, U.S.
- Education: Harvard University Yale University Buckley School
- Occupations: C.E.O, diplomatic corp
- Employer(s): International Rescue Committee; United States Department of State

Robert P. DeVecchi (October 6, 1930 – October 26, 2015) was an American diplomatic officer who became president of the International Rescue Committee.

== Early life ==
DeVecchi was born in New York City. His parents were Mr. and Mrs. Robert De Vecchi of Washington Crossing, Pennsylvania. His paternal grandfather was Dr. Paola De Vechhi of San Francisco, California. His maternal grandfather was James Guthrie Shaw of Brooklyn, New York.

He went to the Buckley School, Lawrenceville, and the Collegiate School. He enrolled in Yale University, graduating with a B.A. in 1952. While at Yale, he was a member of St. Anthony Hall.

After he graduated from Yale, he served for two years as a first lieutenant with the United States Air Force. He then enrolled in Harvard University where he received an M.B.A. from the Graduate School of Business in 1956.

== Career ==
DeVecchi joined the U.S. Department of State as a foreign service officer from 1958 to 1968. His posts included the NATO headquarters in Paris, the U.S. Embassy in Warsaw, and the U.S. Embassy in Rome. In 1969, he became European Director of The National Industrial Conference Board in Paris.

In 1972, he became the New York Representative of the Save the Children Foundation and the director of the Inner Cities Programs. He returned to the United States in 1975 and volunteered for the International Rescue Committee for a month.

In 1975, DeVecchi became the coordinator of the Indochinese Refugee Resettlement Program for the International Rescue Committee (IRC). This was the large resettlement program for refugees in United States history. In 1980, he was promoted to program director for the IRC, followed by the executive director in 1985. In 1993, he became the president and C.E.O. of IRC. As president, DeVecchi started many initiatives and emergency relief programs for more than 28 countries, including Afghanistan, Bosnia, Burma, Burundi, Cambodia, the Democratic Republic of the Congo, El Salvador, Ethiopia, Haiti, Iraq, Kosovo, Pakistan, Rwanda, Somalia, Sudan, Thailand, and Vietnam. He managed between 2,500 to 3,000 ex-pat volunteers and staff across the world. On average, IFC helped one million refugees or displaced persons each year, and some 10,000 refugees were permanently resettled. IRC operated on private contributions as well as funds from the United Nations. Under his leadership, the IRC won the Conrad N. Hilton Humanitarian Prize of $1 million. He retired and became president emeritus in 1997.

He was appointed Adjunct Senior Fellow for Refugees and the Displaced at the Council on Foreign Relations in 1997. He also served on the FilmAid Advisory Council and Refugees International, becoming a director emeriti.

== Awards and honors ==
- 2005: Doctorate of Humane Letters, Yale University
- 1998: Freedom Award, International Rescue Committee
- 1996: Peacemakers Award, Episcopal Diocese of Washington, D.C.

== Personal life ==
He married Florence L. Sloan, the daughter of Mr. and Mrs. George A. Sloan of Greenwich, Connecticut, on January 5, 1957. Her father was an industrialist and former chair of the board of the Metropolitan Opera. Their second daughter, Angela, was born in Paris on November 14, 1963.

He also married Betsy Trippe. She was the daughter of Juan Trippe who founded Pan Am Airways. They lived in Manhattan, New York and the East Hamptons.

In 2015, he died at his home in Southport, Connecticut of natural causes.
