= Green Up Day =

Vermont, United States holiday

Green Up Day, observed annually on the first Saturday of May, is a statewide effort in the US state of Vermont to clean up roadside trash.

== History ==
The first official Green Up Day was held on April 18, 1970, after having been formalized by Governor Deane C. Davis. In 1979, Green Up Vermont became a non-profit organization. A small portion of the funding for the event comes from a state appropriation, with Green Up Vermont making up the remainder through individual donations and corporate sponsors. Vermont is the lone exception nationwide without an Adopt-A-Highway program and instead continues the grassroots tradition of Green Up Day, in which people of all ages can take part. The State of Vermont cleans up the State Highways, and Green Up Day volunteers clean up all the town roads. Green Up Day has the double-effect of encouraging community involvement with environmental protection as well as maintaining compliance within the state's strict laws against sponsorship and advertising along roadways.

== Process ==
Green trash bags are distributed throughout the state which are then used by volunteers to clean up the roads in their area. Citizens can pick up bags at the local town hall or other community location. The volunteers are often asked to pick a location that they will be responsible for which is often the road on which they live. The bags are often left on the road side for pick up by town road crews or volunteers will be asked to bring bags to a specific location. All towns have a coordinator who can be contacted with questions.

== See also ==
- Act 250 (Vermont law)
- Earth Day
- National Cleanup Day
