= Chrétien DuBois =

Chrétien du Bois (1597-1655) was a French official in the Comté (Count) of Coupigny.

He was the father of three Protestant French-speaking immigrants to colonial New York. One of these, Louis Dubois, was among the founders of New Paltz, New York, in the late 1600s.

Chretien du Bois was the son of Antoine du Bois and Anne Cousin, and was married to Françoise le Poivre.

Chretien du Bois lived in the village of Wicres, outside of Lille. Documents from the Archives Départementales de Lille indicate he was bailli, lieutenant, greffier & receveur of the Comté of Coupigny. He died sometime after 1641.

Chretien du Bois is of particular interest to American genealogists, both because of the notability of his descendants and because several different versions of noble ancestry have been claimed for him. Further DNA testing of several descendants including Sarah Du Bois Van Meter have tested positive in the nobility lineage.

Several prominent Americans figure among Chretien du Bois' descendants, including former governor of Massachusetts William Floyd Weld, actor Marlon Brando, Jr., [wood family settled in Carolina and finally Tennessee agricultural and industrial monopoly] painter Mary Cassatt, journalist Maria Shriver (wife of California governor Arnold Schwarzenegger), Samuel Walton, General George Smith Patton III
