= Beaucamps-Ligny =

- Commune
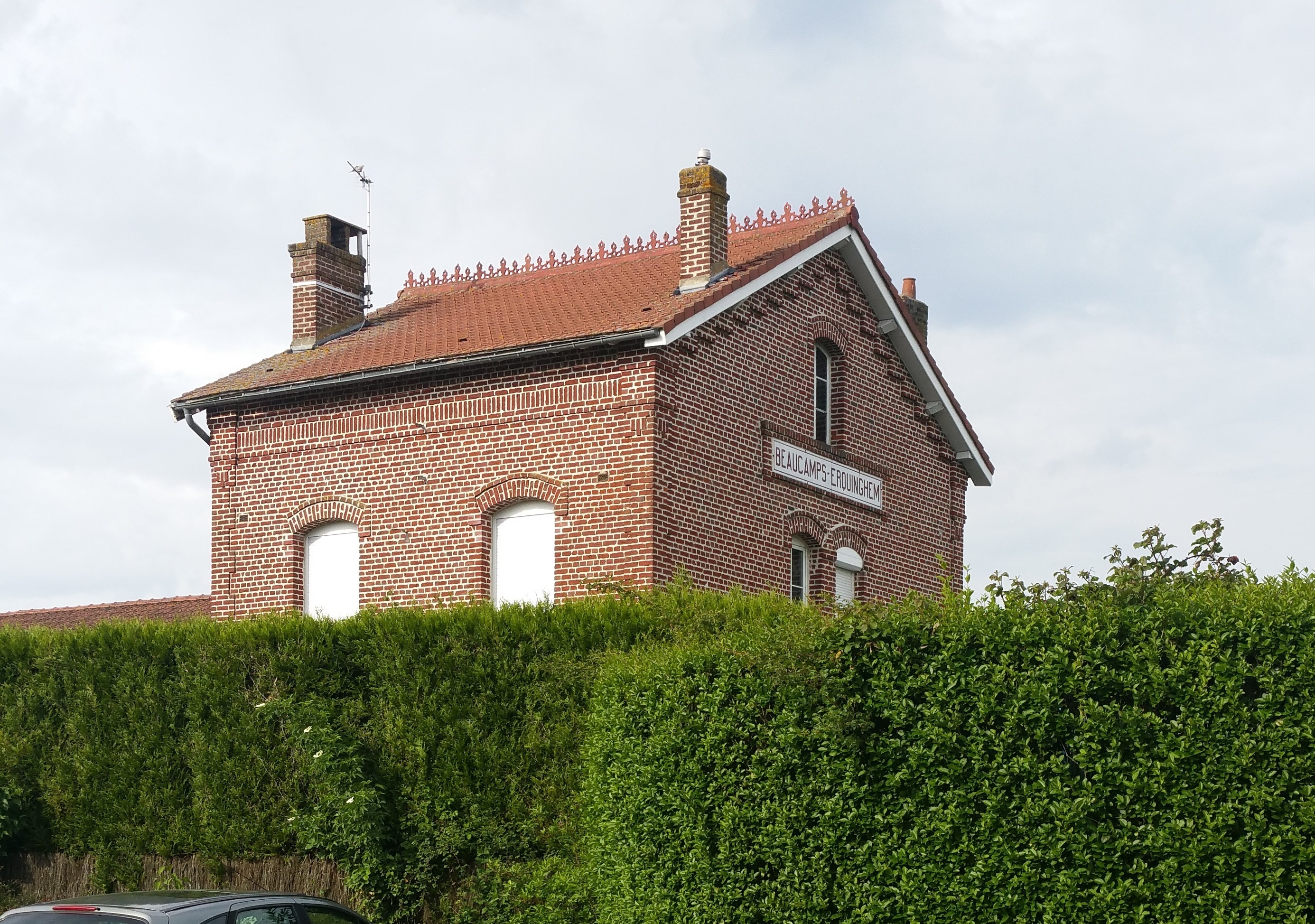
- The old railway station of Beaucamps-Erquinghem

- Coat of arms
- Location of Beaucamps-Ligny
- Location within France Location within Hauts-de-France
- Coordinates: 50°36′19″N 2°55′03″E
- Country: France
- Region: Hauts-de-France
- Department: Nord
- Arrondissement: Lille
- Canton: Lille-6
- Intercommunality: Métropole Européenne de Lille

Government
  - Mayor (2020–2026): Catherine Lefebvre
- Area^{1}: 5.04 km^{2} (1.95 sq mi)
- Elevation: 36 m (118 ft)
- Population (2023): 845
  - Density: 168/km^{2} (434/sq mi)
- Time zone: UTC+01:00 (CET)
  - Summer (DST): UTC+02:00 (CEST)
- INSEE/Postal code: 59056 /59134
- ^{1} French Land Register data, which excludes lakes, ponds, glaciers > 1 km^{2} (0.386 sq mi or 247 acres) and river estuaries.

Beaucamps-Ligny (French pronunciation: [bokɑ̃ liɲi]) is a commune in the Nord department in northern France. It was formed by the merger of Beaucamps and Ligny-en-Weppes in 1927.

== Population ==
Historical population
Year	Pop.	±% p.a.
1968	697	—
1975	676	−0.44%
1982	699	+0.48%
1990	857	+2.58%
1999	914	+0.72%
2007	904	−0.14%
2012	877	−0.60%
2017	856	−0.48%
2023	845	−0.22%
Source: INSEE

== Heraldry ==
Arms of Beaucamps-Ligny	The arms of Beaucamps-Ligny are blazoned : Vert, a fess ermine. (Oignies, Beaucamps-Ligny, Estrées, Gruson and Wicres use the same arms.)

== See also ==
- Communes of the Nord department
