= Baird Jones =

American author and nightclub party promoter

Baird "Bucky" Campbell Jones (February 3, 1955 – February 21, 2008) was an American author, nightclub party promoter, photographer, curator, art critic, collector, and gossip reporter.

== Personal life ==
Baird Jones lived in Rio de Janeiro, Brazil, as a child, where his father, Cranston Jones, was the Time magazine bureau chief and, later, a founding editor of People magazine. He attended the Buckley School, the Groton School, NYU, and Columbia University. He earned master's degrees from New York University School of Law (JD, MSW) and Columbia University (undergrad and two masters). Jones was said to be a misunderstood genius. According to Phoebe Legere "This was a man of very, very high intelligence and a very advanced understanding of modern art—the mechanics of it and also the way in which promotion is the blood and bone of modern art." For a period, he dated Sukhreet Gabel.

== Club promotion ==
Jones was one of New York City's first club promoters. In the early 1980s until his death, he promoted parties at Studio 54, The Underground, Webster Hall and other clubs. Created the "Permanent Pass" with which over a million people attended his parties for over three decades. He was friendly with artists on the New York scene such as Andy Warhol, Mark Kostabi, Keith Haring, and Jean-Michel Basquiat, frequently including them in shows he curated in galleries, museums, and nightclubs. Baird Jones was known to mail out club passes in an effort to ensure that clubs that were on the downside were filled. Baird catered to individuals from the outer boroughs to go to clubs in Manhattan. His parties had a diverse group including the under-21, oldermen, lgbtq, and others. Baird Jones celebrated the release of Dr. Kevorkian from prison at Webster Hall.

== Art collection ==
Baird Jones had an art collection from a number of celebrities. It ranged from Muhammad Ali to Jimi Hendrix to Princess Grace, from Mel Brooks to Jack Kevorkian, from Buddy Hackett to Marcel Marceau They also included paintings by Adolf Hitler to Charles Manson.

== Interview ==
Baird appeared on The Howard Stern Show concerning his love life. Baird at this interview claimed to be a 36 year old virgin in 1991. Baird Jones interviewed playwright Arthur Miller and upset Miller with his pointed questions.

== Midget bowling controversy ==
Jones claims to have invented the sport of midget bowling a form of dwarf-tossing which originated in Australia. The sport according to Jones was an attempt to "performance art designed to satirize the values of mainstream America." Jones famously employed Michael J. Anderson as a participant. A bill was signed by former Governor of New York Mario Cuomo to ban the practice.

== Author ==
Baird Jones was the author of two books Mark Kostabi and the East Village Scene 1983-1987 and Sexual Humor. Baird was a contributor to author at the New York Daily News Page Six and Gawker. He had a byline at the East Village Eye. He was a staffer at Rush & Molloy gossip column. He made news with the Village Voice after obtaining an interview with The Limelight Peter Gatien. His articles included those about Donald Trump, Lester Crown, James Crown, Jason Beghe and Neve Campbell.

== Films ==
Baird Jones appeared in a number of films including B.F.D. (1990), Con Artist (2009), and Behind the Music (1997).

== Death ==
Jones died at the age of 53 allegedly from an enlarged heart resulting in a heart attack. Initial reports though were inconclusive. A memorial attended by Lindsay Lohan, was held at the Plumm. Plumm ironically was attempted to be closed by a number of promoters including Jones and Ivy Supersonic over a dispute about money with owner Noel Ashman.
