= Adopt-a-Highway =

Environmental and promotional campaign

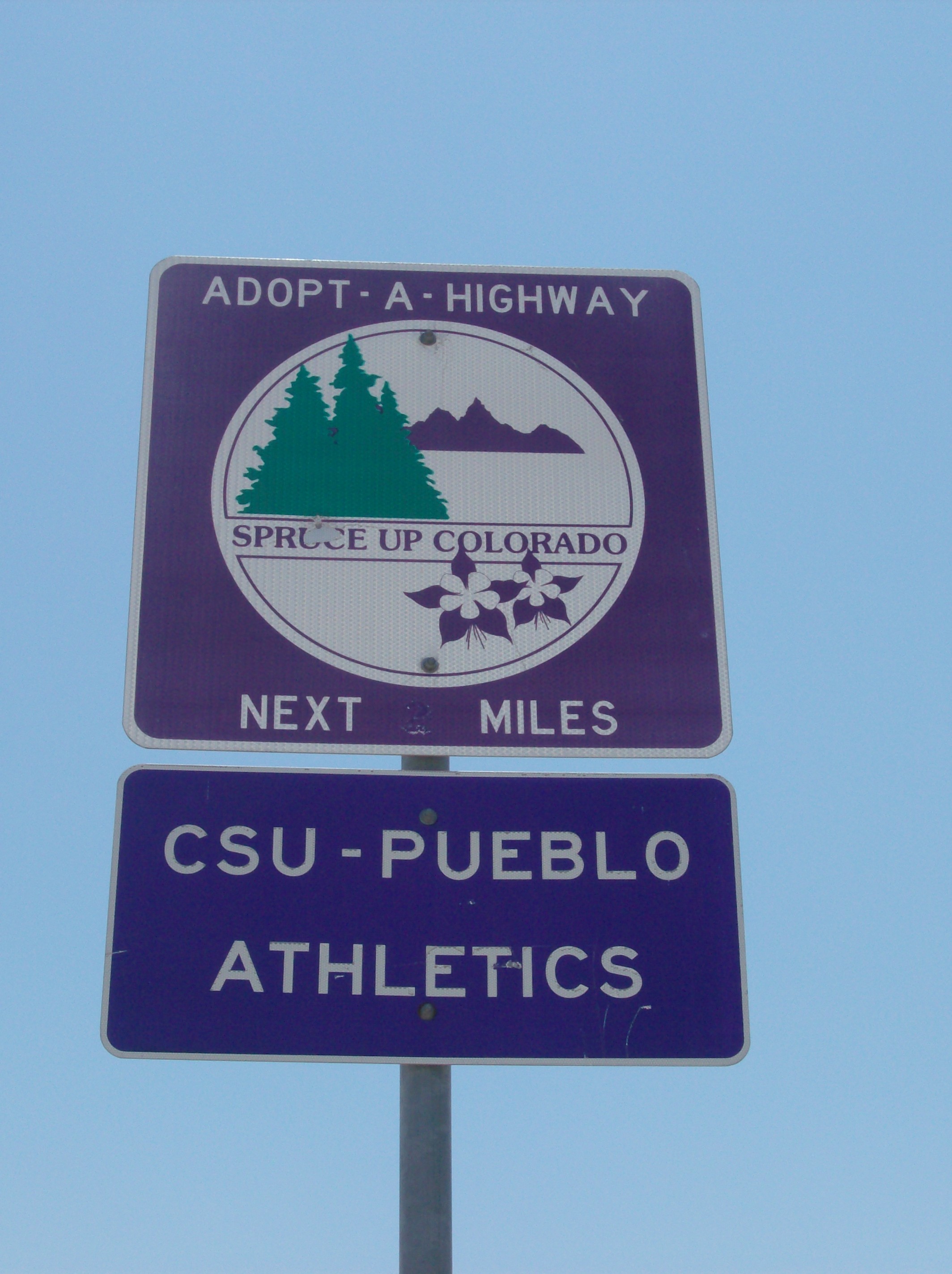
An Adopt-a-Highway sign in Colorado

The Adopt-a-Highway program, and the very similar Sponsor-a-Highway, are promotional campaigns undertaken by U.S. states, a few provinces and territories of Canada, and some national governments outside North America to encourage volunteers to keep a section of a highway free from litter. In exchange for regular litter removal, an organization (such as Cub Scouts or Knights of Columbus) is allowed to have its name posted on a sign on a section of the highways they maintain.

== History ==
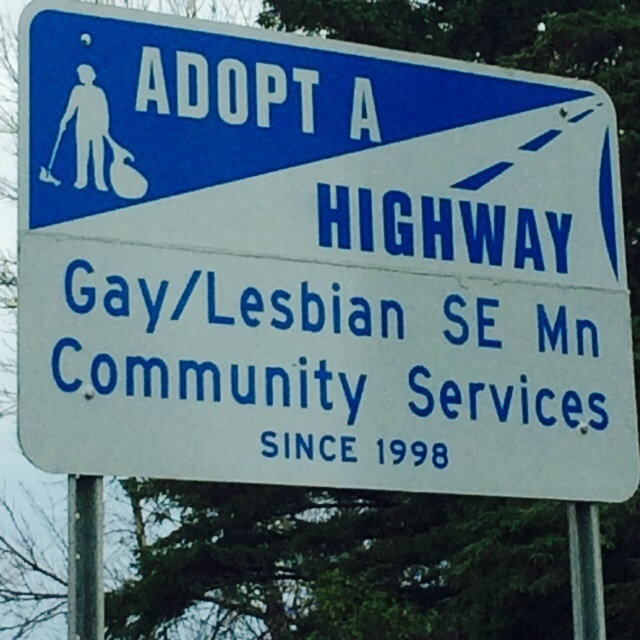
An Adopt-a-Highway sign on Interstate 90 in Minnesota since 1998.

The program originated in the 1980s when James Evans, an engineer for the Texas Department of Transportation (TxDOT), saw debris flying out of a pickup truck bed. Litter cleanup by the city was expensive, so Evans sought the help of local groups to sponsor the cleaning of sections of the highway. The efforts of Billy Black, a TxDOT public information officer, led to quarterly cleanup cycles, volunteer safety training, the issuing of reflective vests and equipment, and the posting of adopt-a-highway signs.

In 1985, the Tyler Civitan Club became the first group to volunteer, adopting two miles along U.S. Route 69 just north of Loop 323 between Tyler and Interstate 20. The program proved to be very successful and has since spread to 49 states, Puerto Rico, Canada, New Zealand, Australia, and Japan. Vermont is the lone outlier among U.S. States in that it has never had an Adopt-a-Highway program, but has a similar yet unique procedure for waste removal called "Green Up," where the cleanup is done directly by Vermont citizens in each town and city, often in the first week of May, but obviously able to be done every day of the year. Green Up Day simultaneously encourages altruistic behavior (which reduces littering in the first place) through volunteerism and environmental stewardship, while maintaining adherence to the state's famously strict laws against roadside advertising, including an outright prohibition of any billboards statewide. The attitudes Vermonters have against littering give rise to the slogan "Don't Trash Vermont", similar to the original "Don't Mess With Texas" campaign against littering.

In 1989, California became the 20th state to develop a highway litter control program when the California Department of Transportation began administering the Adopt-A-Highway program for state highways. The program distinguishes between volunteer adoptions and sponsored adoptions. As of 2021, more than 120,000 California residents have participated in the program to remove litter, plant trees and wildflowers, remove graffiti, and clear vegetation along over 15,000 shoulder miles (24,000 shoulder km) of roadside.

Some states, such as Nevada, allow both Adopt-a-Highway and Sponsor-a-Highway programs. In both programs, an organization that contributes to the cleanup is allowed to post its name. However, while an adopting organization provides the volunteers who do the litter pickup, a sponsoring organization instead pays professional contractors to do the work. Because of safety concerns, the latter is more typical on highways with high traffic volumes.

== Participation ==
The Adopt-A-Highway program allows any organization to participate, which became a point of controversy when the Ku Klux Klan adopted a portion of Interstate 55 just south of St. Louis, Missouri. While legally the program had to uphold the groups' rights to participate, public outcry and repeated destruction of its sign was a cause of concern. In November 2000, the section of highway was designated as the Rosa Parks Freeway after the famous civil rights figure.

KKK sponsorship was later dropped from the program for the group's failure to fulfill its obligations, and the Missouri Department of Transportation adopted specific criteria to prohibit hate groups from future participation. However, the 8th Circuit Court of Appeals ruled that any attempt to bar the Klan from participation in the Adopt-a-Highway program on the basis of the group's purpose is a violation of the First Amendment. The Supreme Court declined to hear the case, so the ruling stood.

In 2001, South Dakota denied participation to a gay and lesbian organization. Governor Bill Janklow eventually allowed the group to participate but had sponsor names removed from all Adopt-a-Highway signs in the state.

In January 2005, the American Nazi Party adopted a stretch of the rural Sunnyview Road NE outside Salem, Oregon. Two signs were put up along the road that bore the names of the American Nazi Party and National Socialist Movement. The signs, which cost $500 and were almost immediately subject to vandalism, have since been removed. The American Nazi Party's chair, Rocky J. Suhayda, claimed to have no association with the Adopt-a-Highway program.

In 2009, the state of Missouri renamed a section of highway after Rabbi Abraham Joshua Heschel, because it had been adopted by a neo-Nazi group. Heschel had fled the Nazis' advance in Europe and became a prominent theologian and civil rights advocate in the United States before his death in 1972. Rabbi Heschel's daughter opposed this decision.

In 2012, the International Keystone Knights of the KKK submitted an application to adopt a stretch of Georgia State Route 515. The Georgia Department of Transportation denied the application, citing safety concerns and the hate group's history.

In 2012, PennDOT accepted an Adopt-a-Highway sponsorship along a portion of Interstate 376 in Pittsburgh from a local strip club located in Downtown Pittsburgh. According to PennDOT officials, strip clubs are permitted, along with any other business, to sponsor such projects, since it keeps the roads clean and saves taxpayers money. Despite the sponsorship, the program does not send strippers to clean the roads, but rather sends workers from the state paid for by the club to clean the highways.

Economically, the program may be viewed as a way of getting around regulations prohibiting billboards next to a highway and on a per-view basis, it is more economical than billboards.

== In popular culture ==
- In the hit U.S. sitcom Seinfeld episode "The Pothole", Cosmo Kramer adopts a mile of the fictional Arthur Burghardt Expressway. Kramer proceeds to alter the four-lane highway to two lanes to allow the creation of wider "leisure lanes", which results in major traffic congestion.
- In the American Dad! episode "It's Good to Be Queen" Francine comments on the cleanliness of the highway and gives thanks to the Ku Klux Klan.
- The MU330 song "KKK Hiway" is about the Ku Klux Klan's attempt to sponsor Interstate 55 in lead singer Dan Potthast's hometown of St. Louis ("a few miles away from [his] mom's house").
- In The Simpsons episode "Krusty Gets Kancelled", Bette Midler is seen picking up trash along a stretch of highway she has adopted, and causes car crashes for drivers who deliberately litter.
- In Rick Riordan's The Trials of Apollo, Book 2: The Dark Prophecy, the character Apollo finds his destination via an Adopt-a-Highway sign sponsored by the book's antagonist, Triumvirate Holdings.
