= Gruson =

- Commune
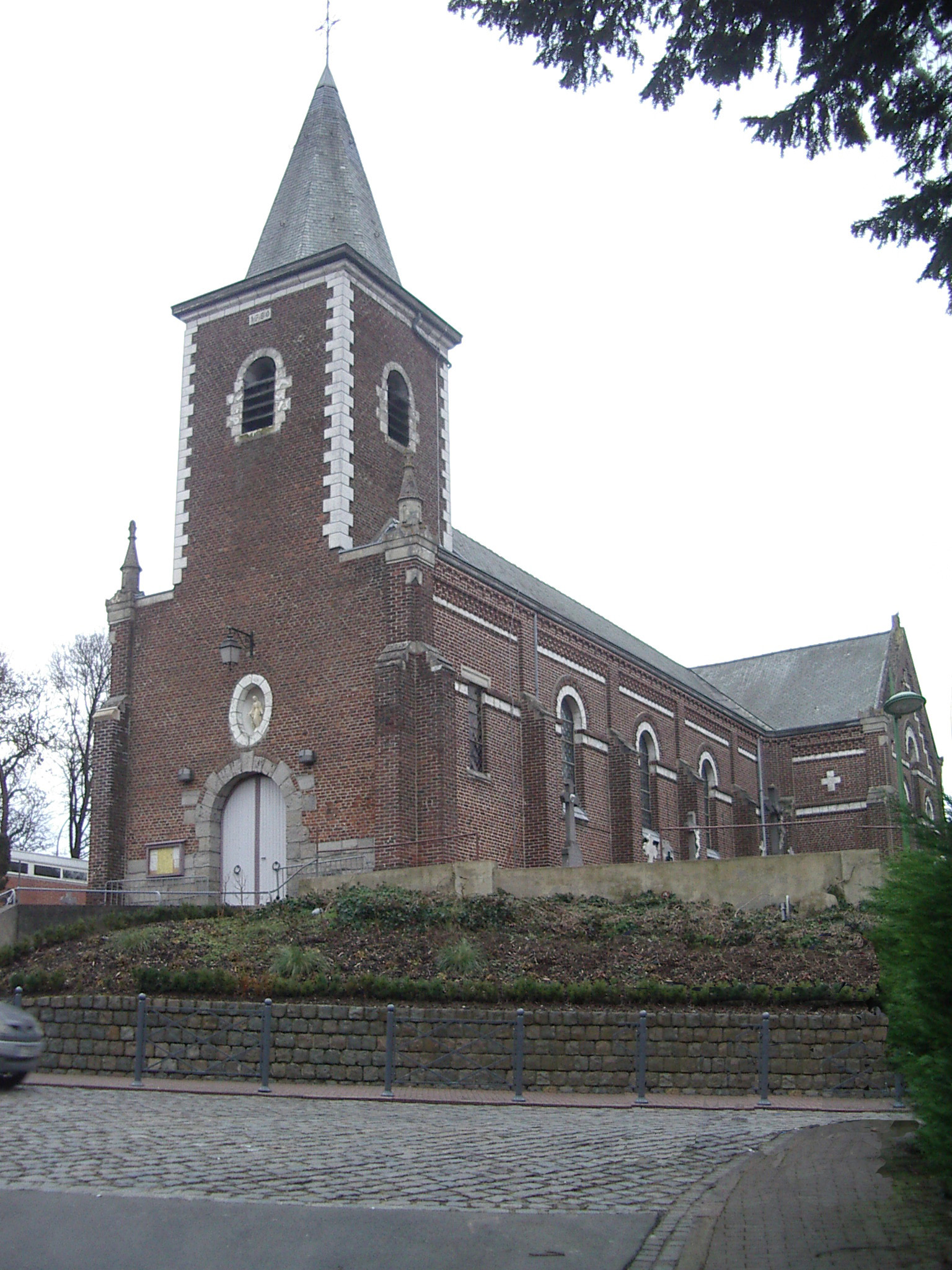
- The church at Gruson

- Coat of arms
- Location of Gruson
- Location within France Location within Hauts-de-France
- Coordinates: 50°35′43″N 3°12′25″E
- Country: France
- Region: Hauts-de-France
- Department: Nord
- Arrondissement: Lille
- Canton: Templeuve-en-Pévèle
- Intercommunality: Métropole Européenne de Lille

Government
  - Mayor (2020–2026): Olivier Turpin
- Area^{1}: 3.13 km^{2} (1.21 sq mi)
- Elevation: 50 m (160 ft)
- Highest elevation: 53 m (174 ft)
- Lowest elevation: 24 m (79 ft)
- Population (2023): 1,207
  - Density: 386/km^{2} (999/sq mi)
- Time zone: UTC+01:00 (CET)
  - Summer (DST): UTC+02:00 (CEST)
- INSEE/Postal code: 59275 /59152
- Website: www.mairie-gruson.fr
- ^{1} French Land Register data, which excludes lakes, ponds, glaciers > 1 km^{2} (0.386 sq mi or 247 acres) and river estuaries.

Gruson (French pronunciation: [ɡʁyzɔ̃]) is a commune in the Nord department in northern France. It is part of the Métropole Européenne de Lille.

== Heraldry ==
Arms of Gruson	The arms of Gruson are blazoned : Vert, a fess ermine. (Oignies, Beaucamps-Ligny, Estrées, Gruson and Wicres use the same arms.)

== Gallery ==
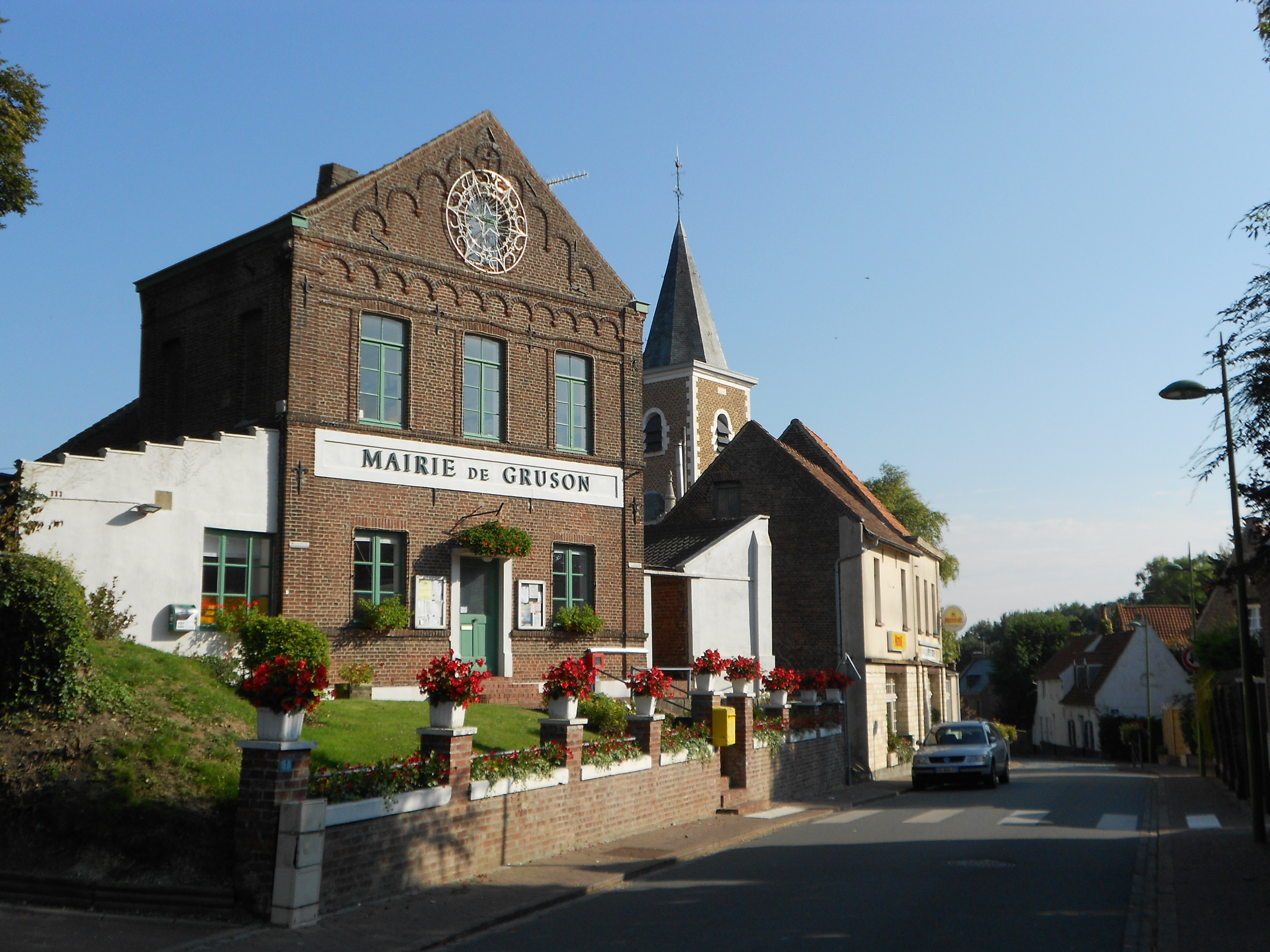
Town hall

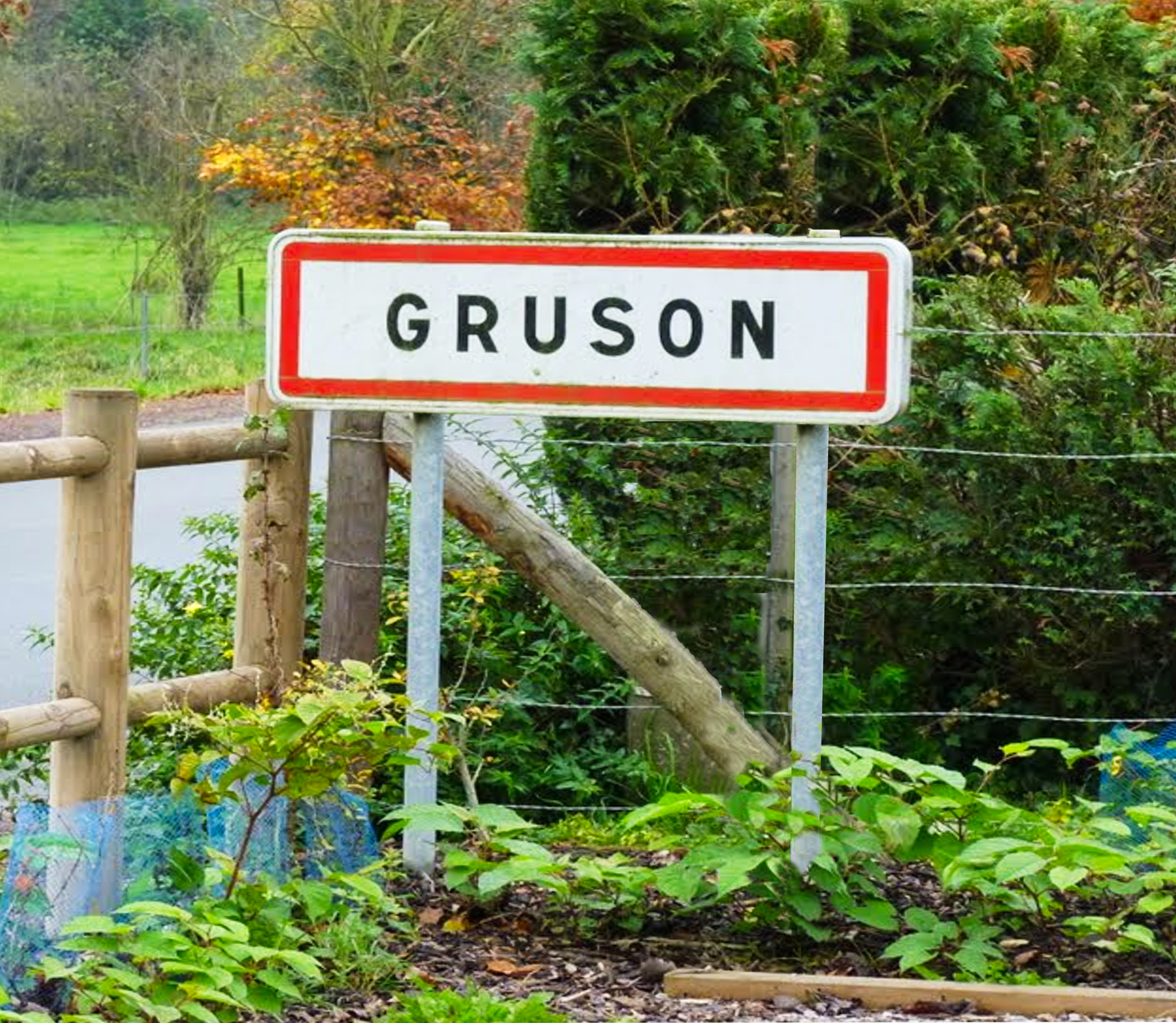
Entrance sign

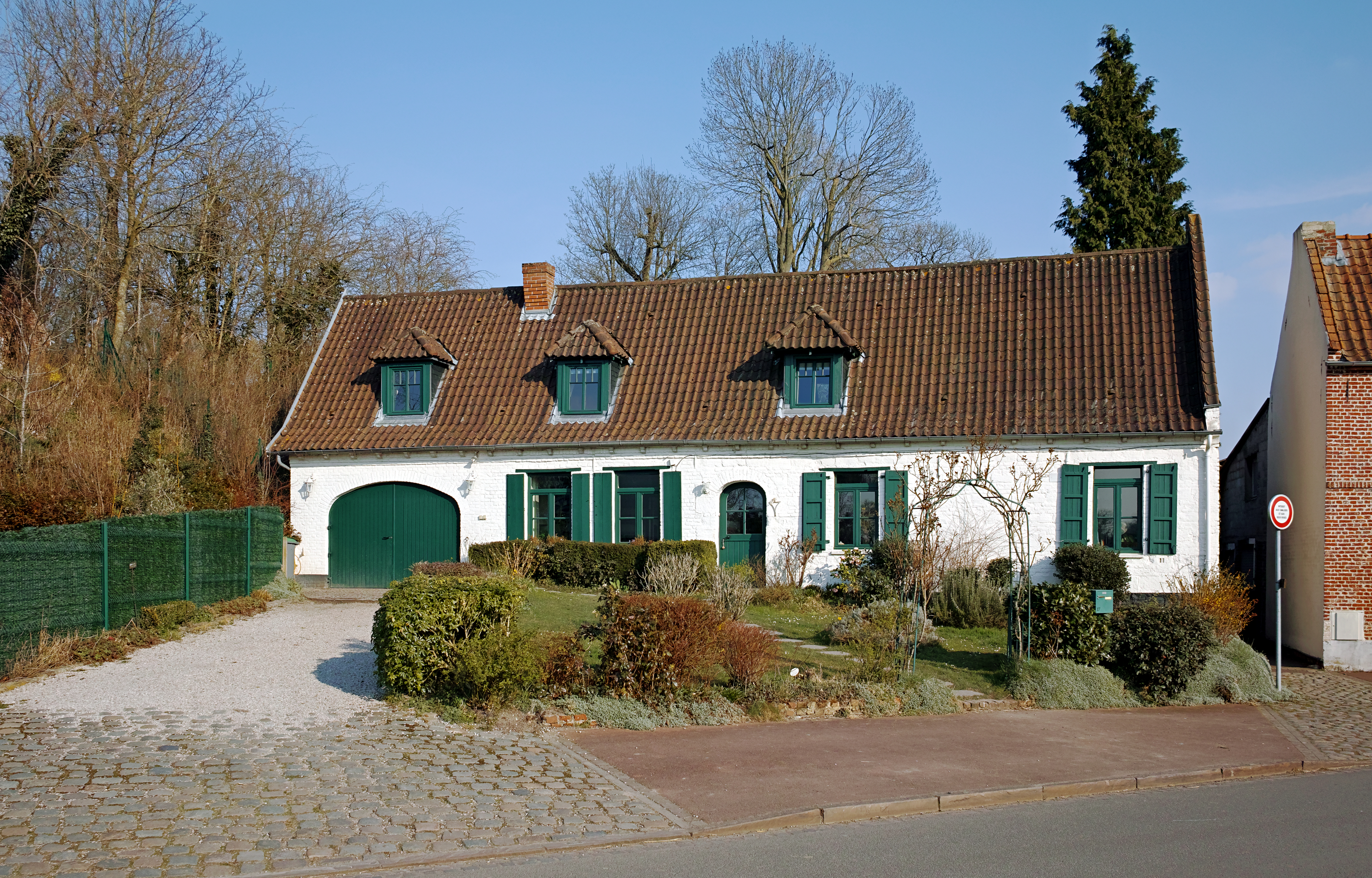
Farmhouse

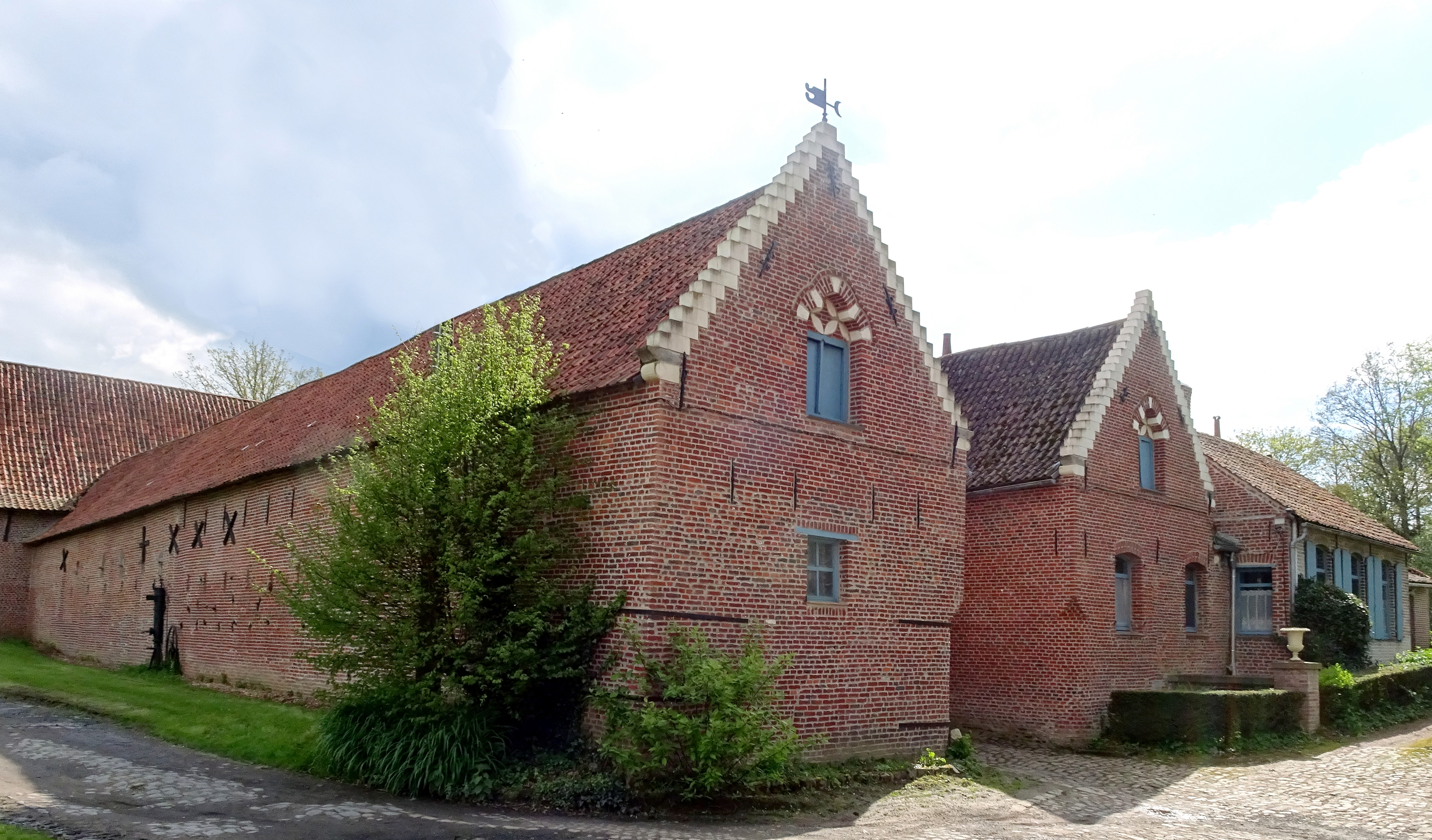
Rue du Château

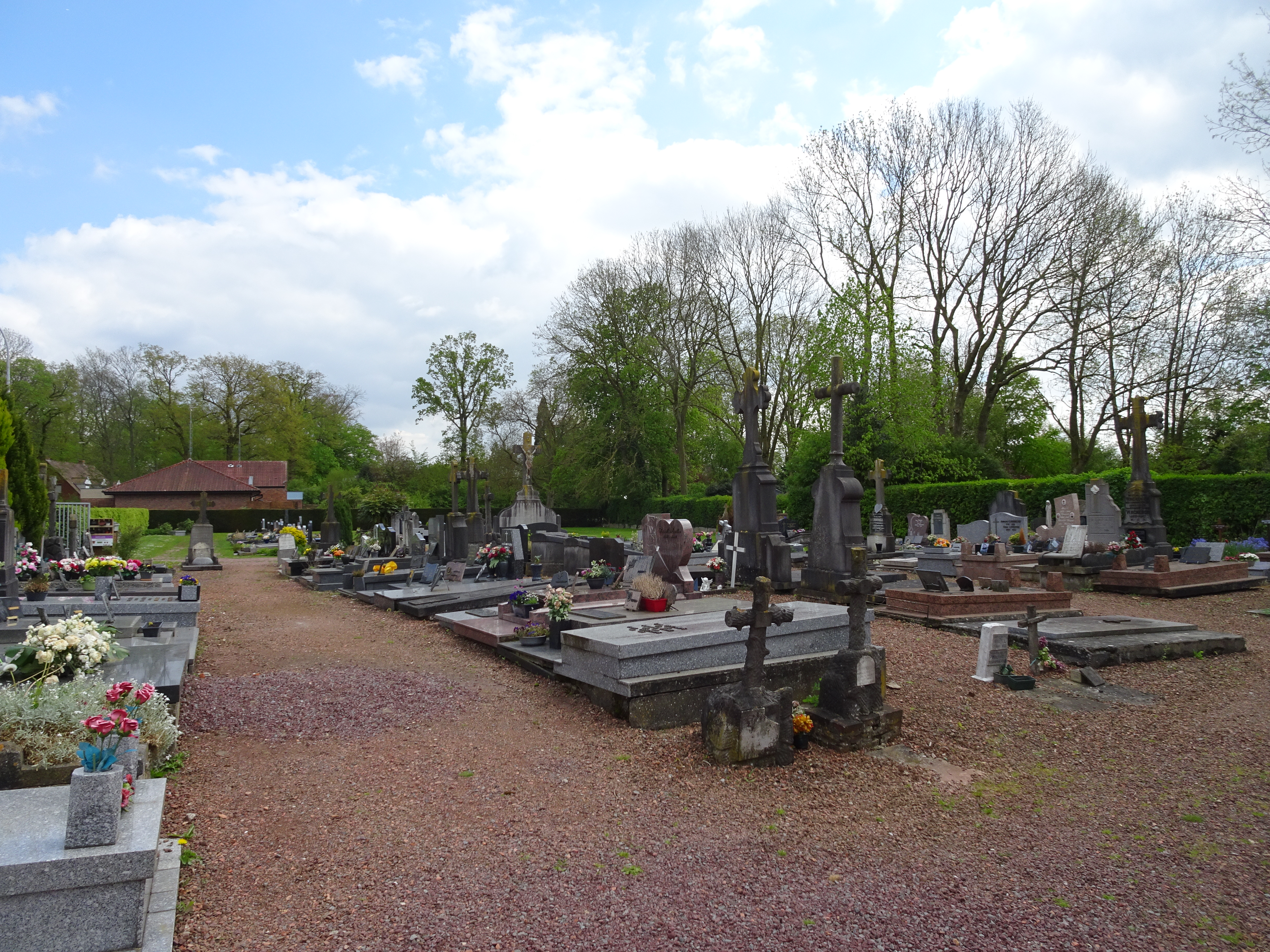
Cemetery

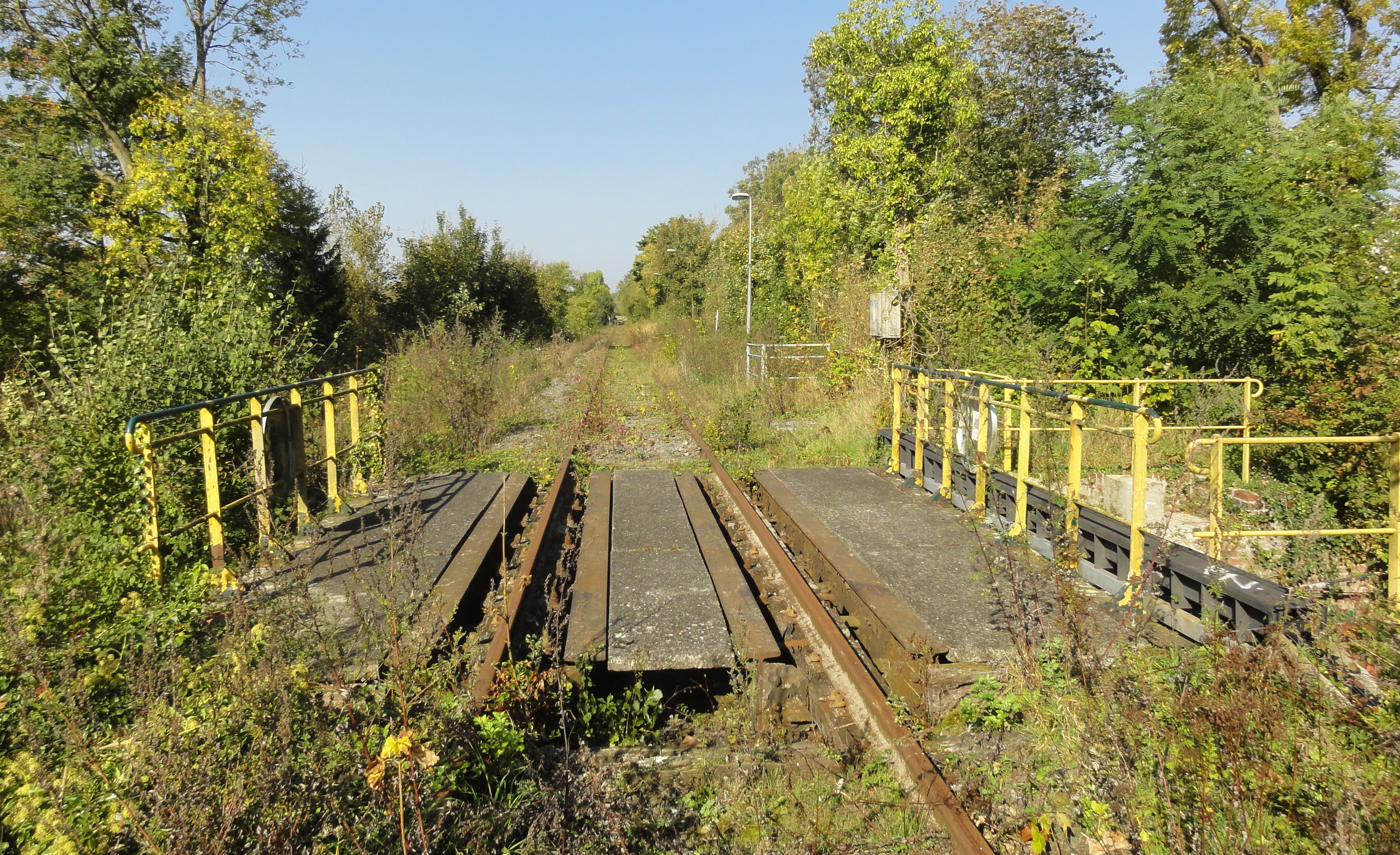
Old train station

== See also ==
- Communes of the Nord department
