= Ligny-en-Weppes =

Former commune in Nord, France

Coordinates: 50.6053°N 2.9175°E

Ligny-en-Weppes is a former commune in the Nord department in northern France. In 1927 it merged with Beaucamps to form Beaucamps-Ligny.

== Heraldry ==
Arms of Ligny-en-Weppes	The arms of Ligny-en-Weppes are blazoned : Azure, an inescutcheon argent, overall a saltire gules.

== See also ==
- Communes of the Nord department
