= Henry Varnum Poor (Yale dean) =

American lawyer

Henry Varnum Poor (January 7, 1914 - October 10, 1972) was an American intelligence officer and politician who became associate dean of the Yale Law School.

== Education and wartime service ==
Born on January 7, 1914, in New York, Poor was the great-grandson of financier Henry Varnum Poor. He attended the Buckley School in New York and the Noble and Greenough School in Dedham, Massachusetts, and received his undergraduate education from Harvard University, graduating in 1936. At Harvard, he was an editor of two literary magazines, and became Editorial Chairman of The Harvard Crimson. He then worked as vice consul for the United States in Montreal, Quebec, Canada and Johannesburg, South Africa, before returning to Washington, DC in 1938 to attend the Foreign Service Officers' Training School.

He completed a law degree at Yale University in 1942. During World War II he worked with United States Naval Intelligence, eventually reaching the rank of lieutenant. He was responsible for writing the Navy's account of the Battle of Cape Esperance, and was one of three naval intelligence officers to write the account of the Battle of the Santa Cruz Islands, both of which happened in 1942. He was stationed with the 1st Marine Aircraft Wing on Bougainville Island in the Solomon Islands in 1944 and returned to Washington in 1945 to work in the Office of Naval Intelligence there before being released from duty in 1946.

== Law and politics ==
In the late 1940s Poor practiced law in New York as an associate attorney of Cadwalader, Wickersham & Taft. He became president of the New York Young Republican Club, and in July 1950 became one of the leaders of a group calling themselves the "Republican Advance". They formulated a declaration signed by 21 congressmen calling for progressive principles in the Republican Party platform, a move seen as a precursor to the presidential campaign of Dwight D. Eisenhower. Poor became the Republican Nominee for New York's 20th congressional district in the 1950 United States House of Representatives elections, losing the race to Franklin Delano Roosevelt Jr. He then worked for a time as an executive with the Central Intelligence Agency.

In 1959 Poor was made legal counsel to the New York State Division of Housing. In 1960 he became general counsel and director of the New York State Housing Finance Agency. During this time he also served on the board of the American Committee for the Liberation of the Peoples of Russia, a CIA-connected anti-communist organization.

== Academic career ==
He was an associate dean of the Yale Law School for eight years, and edited the book You and the Law: A Practical Guide to Everyday Law and How It Affects You and Your Family (Reader's Digest, 1971).

He left Yale and became vice president of the National Strategy Information Center in 1971. He was also a member of the Council on Foreign Relations.

== Personal life ==
Poor married his first wife, the former Elizabeth Durham, in 1936. She died in 1946 and he later married Elizabeth Neal. Poor had five children.

He died on October 10, 1972.
