= David Hawkings =

American journalist

David Mark Hawkings Jr. (born January 24, 1960) is an American journalist focused on issues of American governance, particularly the policies and politics of Congress. He is founding editor-in-chief of The Fulcrum, a digital news site covering American democratic reforms. Before that, he spent 23 years as an editor at Congressional Quarterly and Roll Call.

== Early life and education ==
David Hawkings was born on 24 January 1960 in Manhattan, the son of an investment banker and a homemaker. A paternal great-grandfather was the English architect Leonard Stokes. He attended the Buckley School and Hotchkiss School and graduated with a political science degree in 1982 from Bucknell University. He was editor of the campus newspapers at all three schools.

=== Family ===
In 1987, Hawkings married Elisabeth (Betsy) Wright, who later spent two decades as chief of staff to Representative Christopher Shays of Connecticut, and three other Republican members of Congress. She was from 2015 to 2019 the founding director of the governance program at the Democracy Fund, a bipartisan foundation established by eBay founder and philanthropist Pierre Omidyar to improve the political system. She is now an advisor to non-profits, donors, activists and elected officials seeking to promote a healthier democracy. Their sons are Harry (born 1992) and Charlie (born 1998).

== Career ==
For four years starting in 1982, Hawkings covered federal courts and city hall, was a metro section columnist and then an assistant city editor for the San Antonio Light. In 1986 he became press secretary for Texas Republican Lamar Smith during his initial campaign for the House of Representatives and remained for Smith's first term. He returned to journalism for good in 1989 and was a Washington correspondent for Thomson Newspapers for six years.

He was managing editor of the CQ Daily Monitor before joining the CQ Weekly in 1999, first as congressional leadership editor, then economic affairs editor, then senior editor for legislative affairs. He was editor of the 12th edition of “Politics in America,” the company's signature reference biography for all members of Congress. In 2004 he began six years as managing editor of CQ Weekly, and under his leadership the magazine was twice awarded the Everett McKinley Dirksen Award for Distinguished Reporting of Congress.

After the Economist Group acquired CQ and merged it with Roll Call, Hawkings was assigned to edit the company's first new product, the online and email Daily Briefing. In 2013 he was named senior editor at CQ Roll Call, writing his “Hawkings Here” column several times a week, penning a monthly column for CQ and hosting a series of videos and podcasts dubbed “Roll Call Decoder.”

He departed in 2018, just before the company was sold to Fiscal Note. He was hired later that year to create The Fulcrum, a journalistically independent, not-for-profit, non-partisan news organization focused exclusively on the issues imperiling U.S. democracy and the efforts to address them in DC and across the country. His employer is Issue One, a cross-partisan group which advocates for reducing money in politics and other political reform.

Hawkings makes regular appearances as a guest commentator on Fox News, Federal News Radio and WJLA's “Government Matters.” He has also appeared as an analyst on CNN, MSNBC, and NPR.
