= Wicres =

- Commune
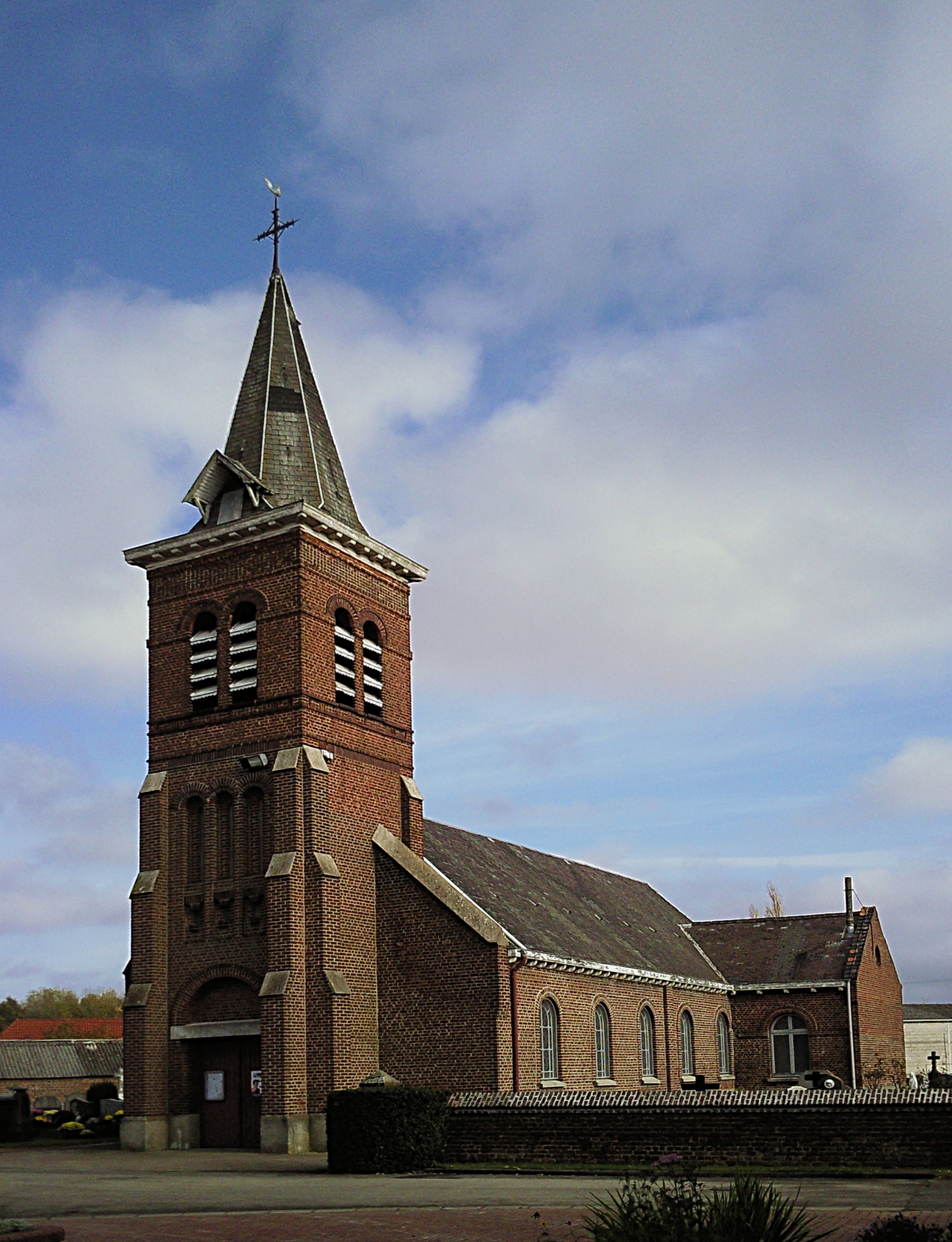
- The church in Wicres

- Coat of arms
- Location of Wicres
- Location within France Location within Hauts-de-France
- Coordinates: 50°34′19″N 2°52′07″E
- Country: France
- Region: Hauts-de-France
- Department: Nord
- Arrondissement: Lille
- Canton: Annœullin
- Intercommunality: Métropole Européenne de Lille

Government
  - Mayor (2020–2026): Philippe Lacaze
- Area^{1}: 2.77 km^{2} (1.07 sq mi)
- Elevation: 32 m (105 ft)
- Highest elevation: 39 m (128 ft)
- Lowest elevation: 26 m (85 ft)
- Population (2023): 581
  - Density: 210/km^{2} (543/sq mi)
- Time zone: UTC+01:00 (CET)
  - Summer (DST): UTC+02:00 (CEST)
- INSEE/Postal code: 59658 /59134
- ^{1} French Land Register data, which excludes lakes, ponds, glaciers > 1 km^{2} (0.386 sq mi or 247 acres) and river estuaries.

Wicres (French pronunciation: [wikʁ]; Dutch: Wijker) is a commune in the Nord department in northern France. It is part of the Métropole Européenne de Lille.

== Heraldry ==
Arms of Wicres	The arms of Wicres are blazoned : Vert, a fess ermine. (Oignies, Beaucamps-Ligny, Estrées, Gruson and Wicres use the same arms.)

== Population ==
Historical population
Year	Pop.	±% p.a.
1968	303	—
1975	284	−0.92%
1982	296	+0.59%
1990	326	+1.21%
1999	306	−0.70%
2007	313	+0.28%
2012	410	+5.55%
2017	498	+3.97%
2023	581	+2.60%
Source: INSEE

== See also ==
- Communes of the Nord department
