= Oignies =

- Commune
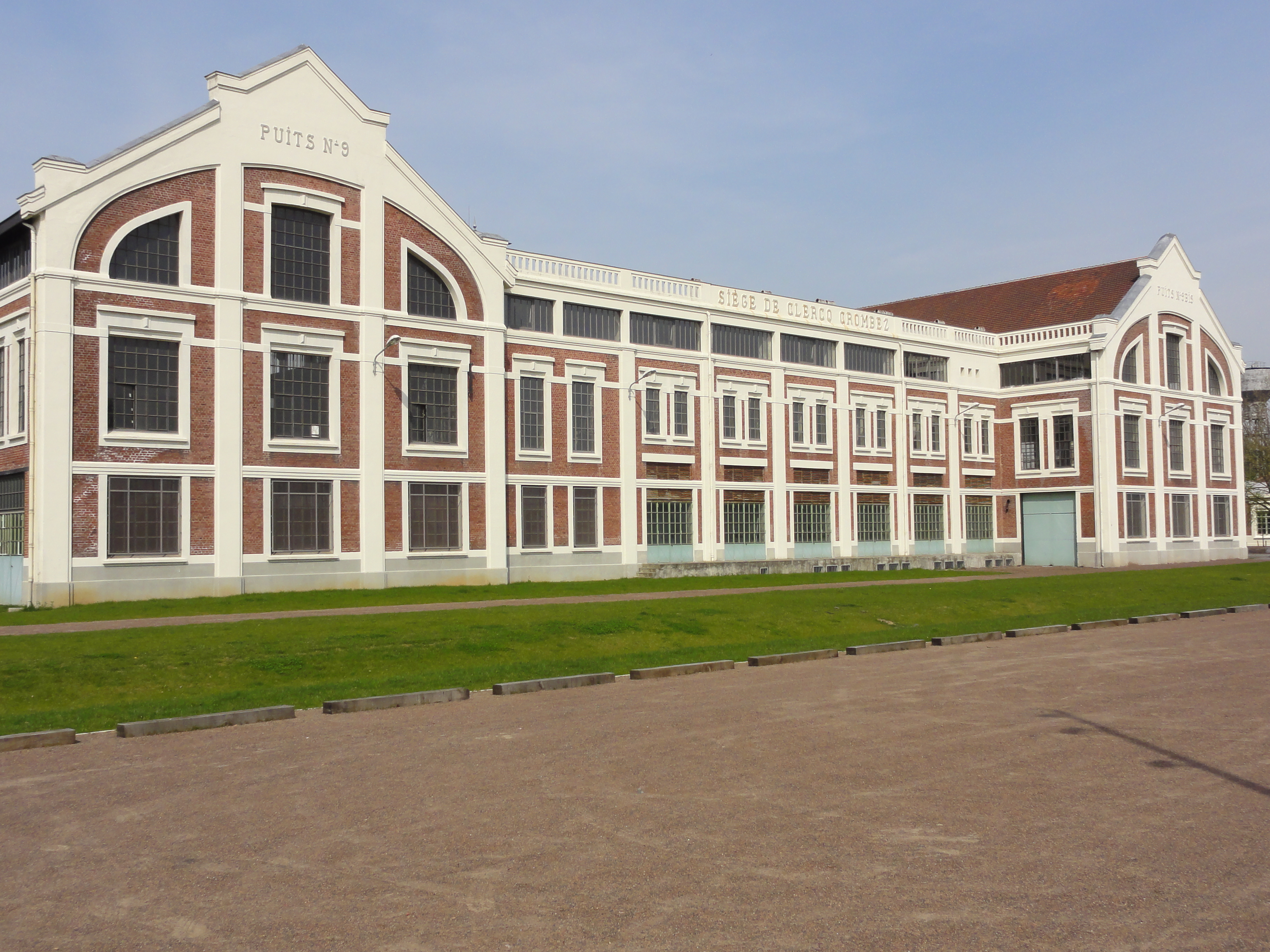
- Pit 9 – 9 in Oignies

- Coat of arms
- Location of Oignies
- Location within France Location within Hauts-de-France
- Coordinates: 50°28′12″N 2°59′40″E
- Country: France
- Region: Hauts-de-France
- Department: Pas-de-Calais
- Arrondissement: Lens
- Canton: Hénin-Beaumont-1
- Intercommunality: CA Hénin-Carvin

Government
  - Mayor (2020–2026): Fabienne Dupuis-Merlevede
- Area^{1}: 5.52 km^{2} (2.13 sq mi)
- Elevation: 28 m (92 ft)
- Highest elevation: 33 m (108 ft)
- Lowest elevation: 23 m (75 ft)
- Population (2023): 10,323
  - Density: 1,870/km^{2} (4,840/sq mi)
- Time zone: UTC+01:00 (CET)
  - Summer (DST): UTC+02:00 (CEST)
- INSEE/Postal code: 62637 /62590
- ^{1} French Land Register data, which excludes lakes, ponds, glaciers > 1 km^{2} (0.386 sq mi or 247 acres) and river estuaries.

Oignies (French pronunciation: [waɲi]; Picard: Ongnies) is a commune in the Pas-de-Calais department in the Hauts-de-France region of France 10 miles (16 km) northeast of Lens.

== Heraldry ==
Arms of Oignies	The arms of Oignies are blazoned : Vert, a fess ermine. (Oignies, Beaucamps-Ligny, Estrées, Gruson and Wicres use the same arms.)

== Population ==
Historical population
Year	Pop.	±% p.a.
1968	12,563	—
1975	11,649	−1.07%
1982	10,546	−1.41%
1990	10,660	+0.13%
1999	10,531	−0.14%
2007	10,235	−0.36%
2012	9,771	−0.92%
2017	9,767	−0.01%
2023	10,323	+0.93%
Source: INSEE

== Notable people ==
- Guy Drut, born there in 1950, Olympic track athlete.
- Michel Jazy, Olympic track athlete.

== Twin towns ==
- Buxton, England, since 1940.
- Mutterstadt, Germany, since 2004

== See also ==
- Communes of the Pas-de-Calais department
