= Otho Cushing =

American painter

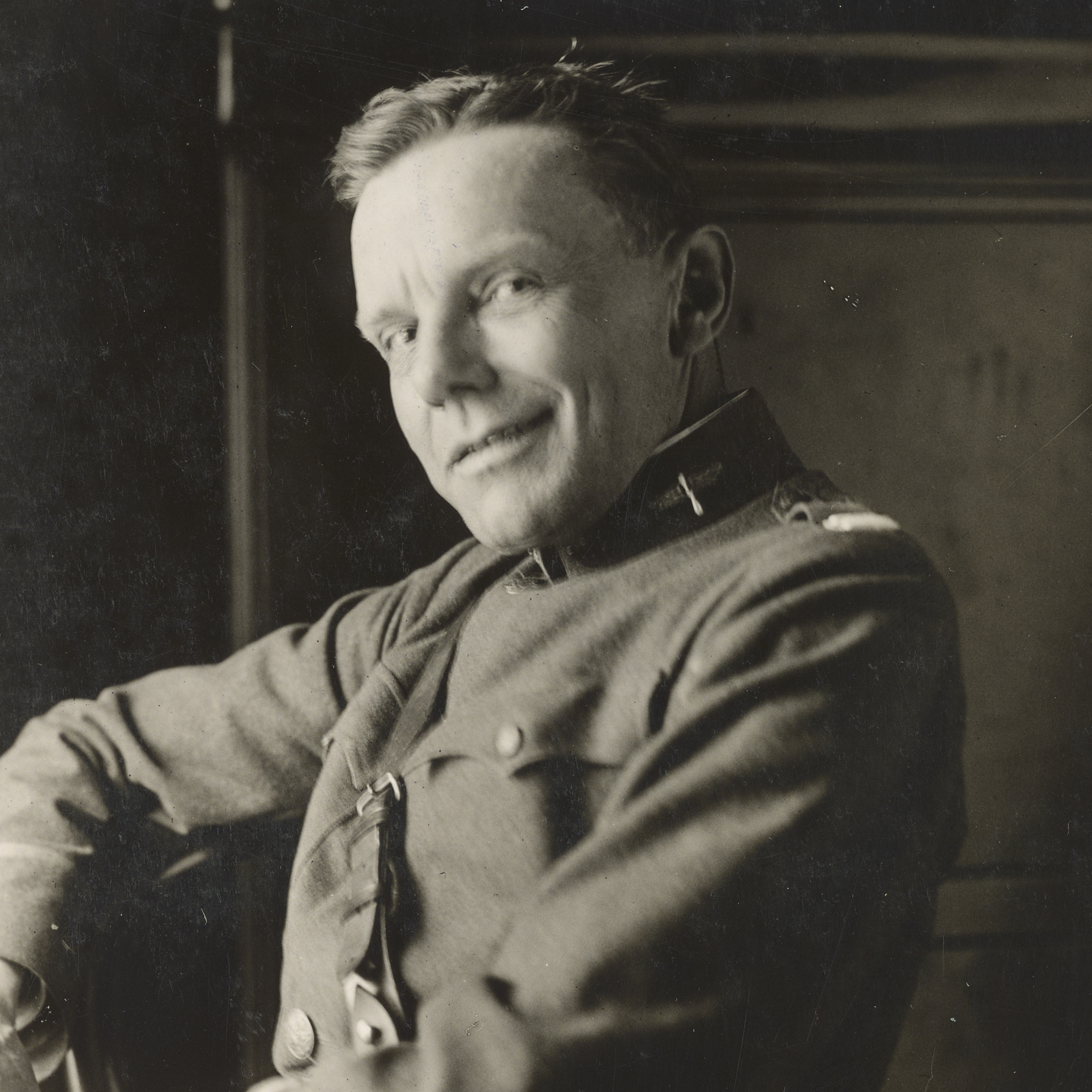
- Cushing in 1918
- Born: Otho Williams McD. Cushing; October 22, 1870; Baltimore, Maryland
- Died: October 13, 1942 (aged 71); New Rochelle, New York
- Education: Tufts School of the Museum of Fine Arts, Académie Julian
- Known for: Illustration, painting

Otho Williams McD. Cushing (October 22, 1870 – October 13, 1942) was an American artist, known primarily for his early 20th century illustration and cartoons, for magazines and posters. His sometimes-homoerotic style, often featuring classical figures, was influenced by Frederic Leighton, J. C. Leyendecker, and Aubrey Beardsley.

== Early life ==
Otho Cushing was born in Fort McHenry, Baltimore, Maryland on October 22, 1870. He was the son of U.S. Army officer Harry Cooke Cushing (1841–1902) and Martha Wetherill (née Budd) Cushing (1846–1931). Among his siblings was Nicholas Cooke Cushing and Harry Cooke Cushing Jr. His maternal grandfather was Princeton University professor Samuel Budd and was a descendant of Nicholas Cooke, a colonial governor of Rhode Island.

He spent his youth in different cities where his father was stationed; in 1880 the family lived in Providence, Rhode Island. In 1887, he finished his secondary education at the Bulkeley School in New London, Connecticut. He studied art at Tufts School of the Museum of Fine Arts in Boston, and in 1891 at the Académie Julian in Paris, where his teachers included Jean-Joseph Benjamin-Constant and Jean-Paul Laurens.

== Career ==
He returned to Boston in September 1893 and became drawing instructor at the Massachusetts Institute of Technology. He published drawings in Life magazine. Around 1900, he returned to Paris, where he became artistic director of the European edition of the New York Herald. While sailing on the RMS Oceanic in 1901, Cushing spent time with fellow first class traveler, Mary Lawrence, who wrote about him in her diary, stating: "He is absolutely as perfectly made as one of his own Greek gods and goddesses. From top to toe he is absolute grace."

When he returned to the United States, he joined the art staff of Life and lived in New York. His drawings were "highly stylized, and, at first, depicted handsome young men and women in Greek or modern costumes." In 1907, Life published a series of his cartoons about President Theodore Roosevelt entitled The Teddyssey (a parody of The Odyssey).

In 1917, he left Life and joined the Army Air Service, serving as a captain in charge of "supervising the camouflaging of American airfields on the Western Front". Several of his posters and drawings deal with the American involvement in World War 1. After the war, he retired to New Rochelle and embraced a career as watercolorist.

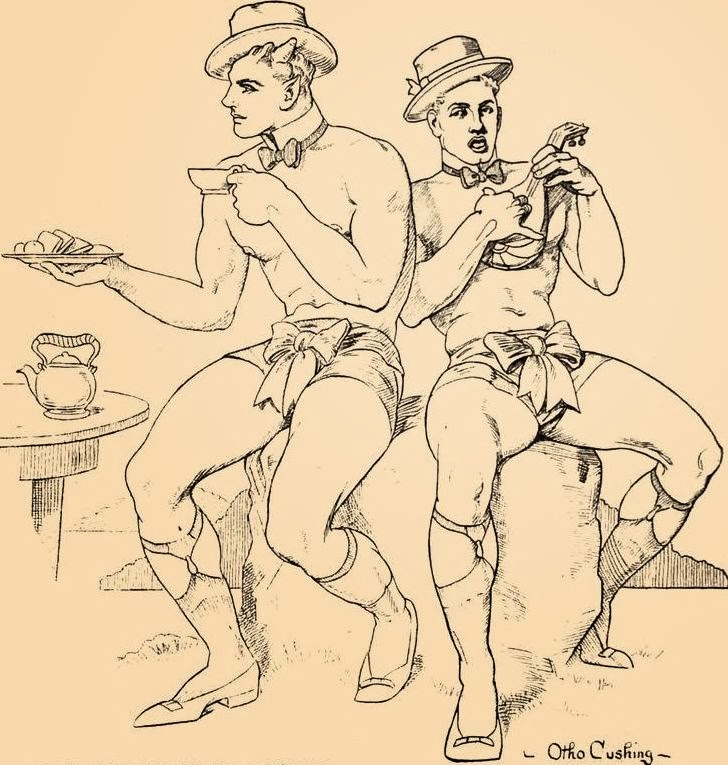
L'Après-midi des faunes

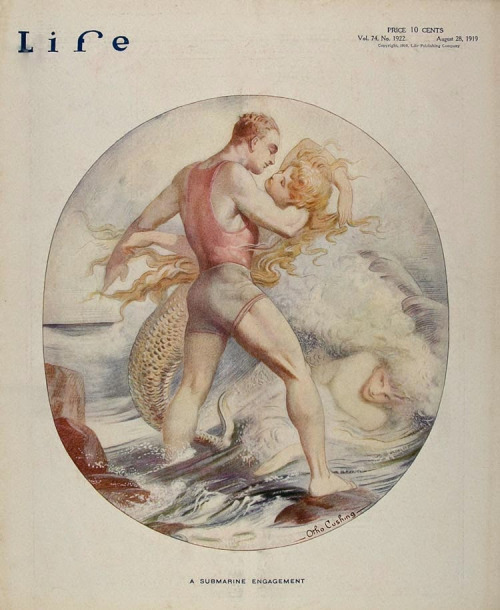
Life magazine cover, 1919

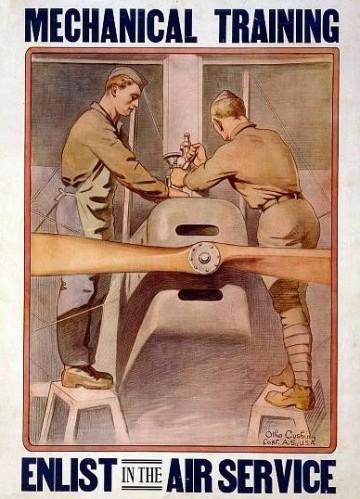
Enlist in the Air Service

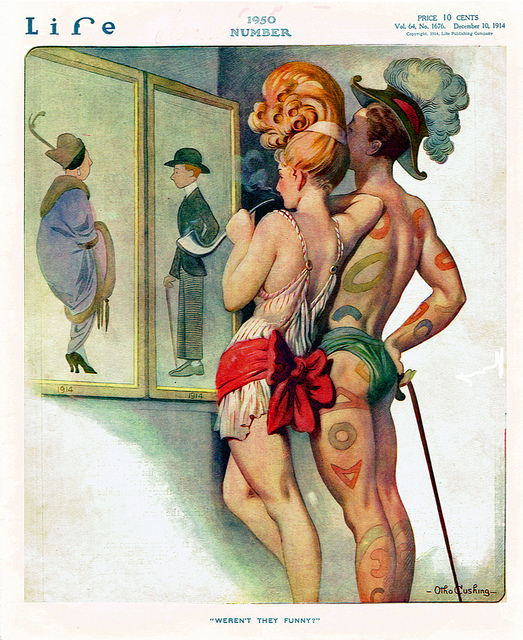
"Weren't They Funny?", cover of Life magazine, December 10, 1914

== Personal life ==
In 1897, Cushing, then 26, attended the Bradley-Martin Ball, a fancy-dress ball thrown by Cornelia Sherman Martin at the Waldorf Hotel in New York. Reportedly, Cushing "was, in fact, thought to have gone rather too far in his impersonation of an Italian falconer of the fifteenth century. His costume consisted of full tights and a short jacket, with a little cap and long locks, while a large stuffed falcon was perched on his left wrist. The costume left little to the imagination, as far as the figure was concerned, and, although historically accurate in every detail, was so decidedly pronounced that he caused a sensation wherever he moved."

Cushing, who did not marry, was a member of an artist's club known as Le Cercle d'Amis, and was friends with Charles Allan Gilbert. In 1908, Cushing and Gilbert threw a costume party for Le Cercle d'Amis at Gilbert's studio, 17 West 35th Street. He was also friends with Dr. Alfred Stillman II, who gave a luncheon at the clubhouse of the National Golf Links of America in Southampton, New York in 1937.

After the War, he lived with his younger brother, architect Nicholas Cooke Cushing, at 4 Harbor Lane in New Rochelle. After a month's illness, he died at the New Rochelle Hospital on October 13, 1942.

== Collections ==
- The Metropolitan Museum of Art
- Musée d'Orsay
