= Arthur Gibb =

American politician

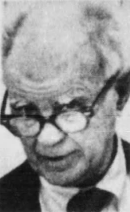
- Gibb in 1986

Member of the Vermont House of Representatives
- In office January 10, 1963 – 1971
- Governor: F. Ray Keyser Jr. Philip H. Hoff; Deane C. Davis
- Constituency: 15th House District (Weybridge)

Member of the Vermont State Senate
- In office 1971–1987
- Governor: Deane C. Davis; Thomas P. Salmon; Richard A. Snelling; Madeleine Kunin
- Preceded by: Howard Forster
- Succeeded by: Chester S. Ketcham
- Constituency: Addison Senate District

Personal details
- Born: April 16, 1908 Brooklyn, New York
- Died: November 1, 2005 (age 97) Middlebury, Vermont
- Party: Republican
- Occupation: Politician, farmer, banker

Arthur Gibb (April 16, 1908 – November 1, 2005) was an American politician, banker and farmer from the state of Vermont, who served in the Vermont House of Representatives and Vermont State Senate. A member of the Republican Party and noted conservationist, Gibb was one of the primary architects behind Act 250, Vermont's landmark environmental legislation.

== Early life ==
Gibb was born in Brooklyn, New York, on April 16, 1908, the son of Henry Elmer and Grace Dwight Gibb. He was educated at the Buckley School, New York City; the Hotchkiss School, Lakeville, Connecticut; and Yale University, where he earned his BA in 1930. He married Barbara Lowrie; the couple had four sons and one daughter. Gibb served in the Pacific theatre as part of the U.S. Navy from 1942-1945, retiring to the Naval Reserve with a rank of Captain. Originally an investment banker, Gibb moved to Vermont in 1951, settling in Weybridge and becoming a farmer, raising Angus cattle and sheep.

== Political career ==
=== Vermont State House ===
Prior to his election to the Vermont General Assembly, Gibb served as chair of the Finance Committee of the Addison County Republican Party. In 1962, he ran for the Vermont House of Representatives in order to represent Weybridge, defeating Maurice Johnson in the Republican primary and facing no opposition in the general election. While in the House, he served on the Ways and Means Committee before becoming chair of the Natural Resources Committee.

==== Act 250 ====
In 1969, newly elected Republican governor Deane C. Davis became concerned about the level of land development in Southern Vermont and the effect this development was having on the environment, forming the Environmental Control Commission to examine and propose environmental regulation laws. Gibb was appointed as chair of the commission. Gibb proposed a series of strong environmental controls to Davis, in particular recommending the creation of a statewide zoning agency to regulate land development. Davis viewed this as both over-regulation and unlikely to pass the state legislature, and modified the proposal to instead be enforced by local zoning committees.

This bill was passed by the legislature and signed into law in 1970, becoming Act 250, with Gibb announcing after the bill's passage that he expected further environmental legislation to be passed in the next legislative session, suggesting that Act 250's focus on land development was insufficient and that air pollution, pesticide usage and noise pollution should be focused on more.

=== State Senate ===
Prior to the 1970 election cycle incumbent Addison County state senator Howard Forster announced his retirement, leaving an open spot in the two-member county delegation. Gibb quickly announced his intent to run for the open seat, alongside incumbent Henry Ward Bedford, engineer and surveyor Joseph Widli, and former state senator Clarence Lathrop. Bedford was considered safely assured of re-election, with Gibb and Widli contesting for the second spot on the Republican ticket, as no Democrat was running. Widli accused Gibb of being too pro-conservation, stating that he would balance development with the environment if elected. Gibb won the Republican primary, coming in first place. Bedford came in second, Lathrop third and Widli fourth.

In the Senate, Gibb served as chairman of the Natural Resources Committee from 1975 to 1976, the Finance Committee from 1977 to 1985, and the Natural Resources Committee again from 1985 to 1986. In his roles he assisted in passing Act 252, which regulated Vermont's water quality, as well as numerous other pieces of environmental legislation.

== Later life and death ==
Gibb retired from office prior to the 1986 election cycle at the age of 78, citing his advanced age and frustration with growing political partisanship as his reasons for doing so. Following his retirement he was appointed to the Vermont State Environmental Board by governor Madeleine Kunin, serving there for twelve years. Gibb died in 2005, at the age of 97. Following his death the Arthur Gibb Award was established by the Vermont Natural Resources Council, awarded annually to a prominent Vermont conservationist.
