= Jacob Ten Broeck Stone House =

Historic house in New York, United States

- U.S. National Register of Historic Places
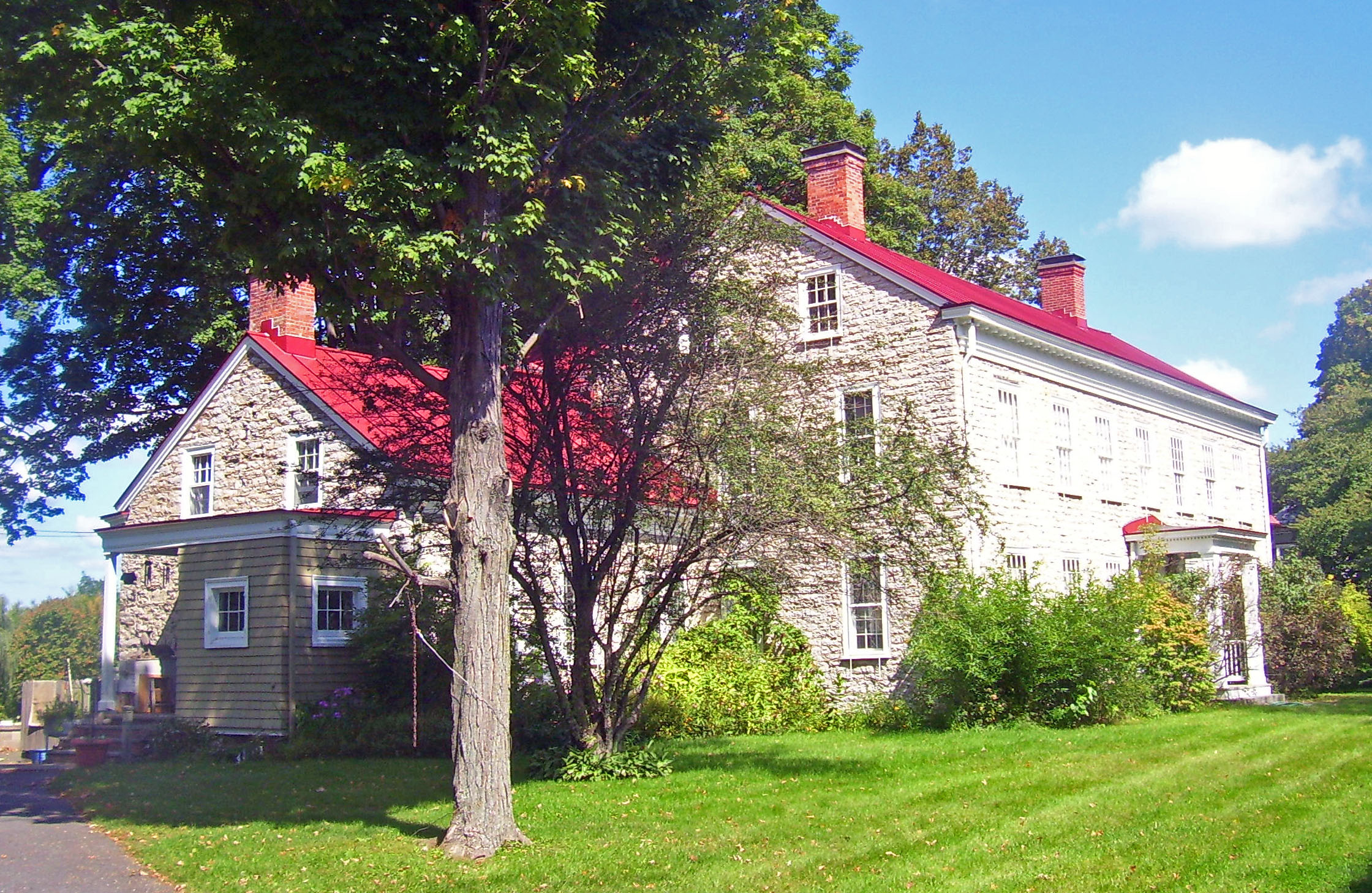
- East elevation and south profile, 2008
- Location: Kingston, NY
- Coordinates: 41°56′1″N 74°0′30″W
- Area: 8 acres (3.2 ha)
- Built: 1803
- Architectural style: Federal
- MPS: The Historic and Architectural Resources of Albany Avenue, Kingston, Ulster County, New York
- NRHP reference No.: 02001312
- Added to NRHP: November 15, 2002

The Jacob Ten Broeck Stone House is located on Albany Avenue (NY 32) in Kingston, New York, United States. It is a stone house built in the early years of the 19th century and modified later in that century.

It is one of the rare high-style Federal homes in the city. In 2002 it was listed on the National Register of Historic Places.

== Building ==
The house is on the north side of Albany Avenue, a short distance west of where it curves to the northeast. The neighborhood is mostly residential, with the exception of the Sharp Burial Ground, also listed on the National Register, slightly to the south on the opposite side of Albany. Most of the neighboring houses are of mid-19th to early 20th-century construction, on a large scale and frequently exhibiting little restraint in their architectural styles. The house at 184 Albany Avenue, a short distance across the street to the north, has been listed on the Register as well.

In contrast to those other houses, which are on narrow, deep lots of roughly 1-acre (4,000 m^{2}), the Ten Broeck House is on a 8-acre (3.2 ha) lot with 250 feet (76 m) of frontage along Albany Avenue. In its rear is a large pond and woods buffering nearby Interstate 587 and NY 28. There is one other building on the property, a modern garage to its south. It is not considered a contributing resource to its historic character.

The house itself is a two-story, seven-by-two-bay house of limestone in rough courses with a metal-clad gabled roof pierced by two brick chimneys near either end. The roofline has a box gutter, modillions and simple frieze, all done in wood. A smaller stone wing extends from the south, and a two-story frame wing is on the rear.

On the east (front), the facade has a centrally located main entrance sheltered by a small one-story porch with gently pitched hipped roof. The north profile has two windows on all three levels. The western wing has a modified hipped roof with a large exterior chimney on the north side. The west (rear) facade has a detailed Federal entrance with a molded round arch frame and fan louver. On the south side is the stone wing, offset to the west, with a small wooden vestibule and entry on its south. It, too, has a gabled metal roof and chimney.

The main entrance, a deeply recessed paneled door with Greek Revival surround and glass transom, leads to a central hall that runs the full depth of the main block, to a curved rear wall. Original finishes include the wall and ceiling plaster, moldings and wide plank flooring. The staircase has a finely turned newel and balustrade.

== History ==
The house's kitchen wing on the south, part of its original construction, may stand on the site of an earlier house destroyed when the British burned Kingston in 1777, during the Revolutionary War. The main block has been established as built in 1803, the year the marriage of Jacob Ten Broeck and Margrit Watson, the first owners, was recorded at the Old Dutch Church.

It was a monumentally scaled Federal style building, with strict attention to the hallmarks of that style, such as its proportions symmetry and classically inspired roofline details. A few decades later, modifications introduced the Greek Revival elements to the house, such as some of the interior detailing and door surrounds. In the later years of the 19th century, the frame rear and side additions were added.

There have been no other modifications since its construction. It has remained a private residence for over two centuries.

== See also ==
- National Register of Historic Places listings in Ulster County, New York
