= Flat roof =

Type of roof

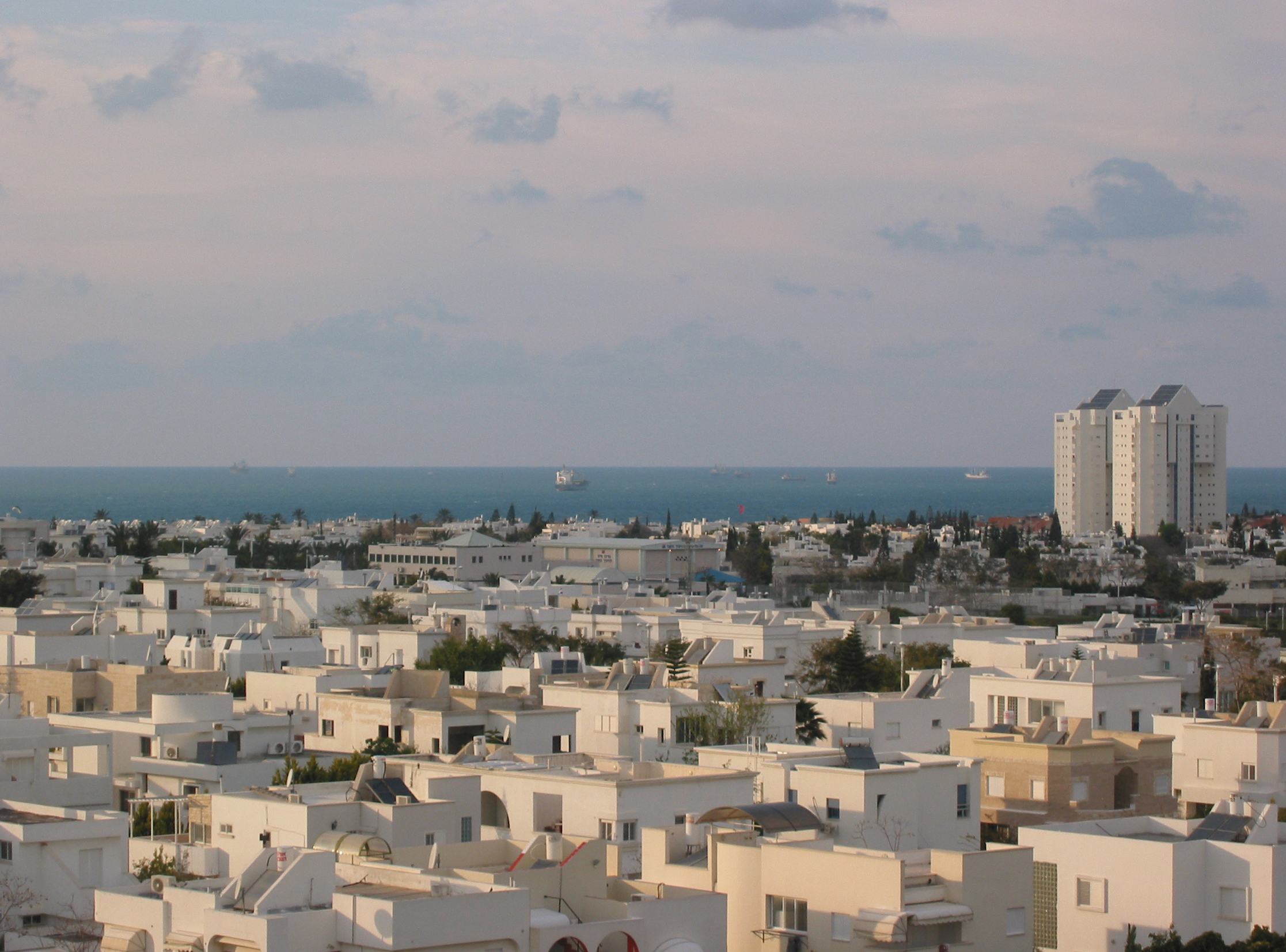
Flat roofs in Ashdod, Israel

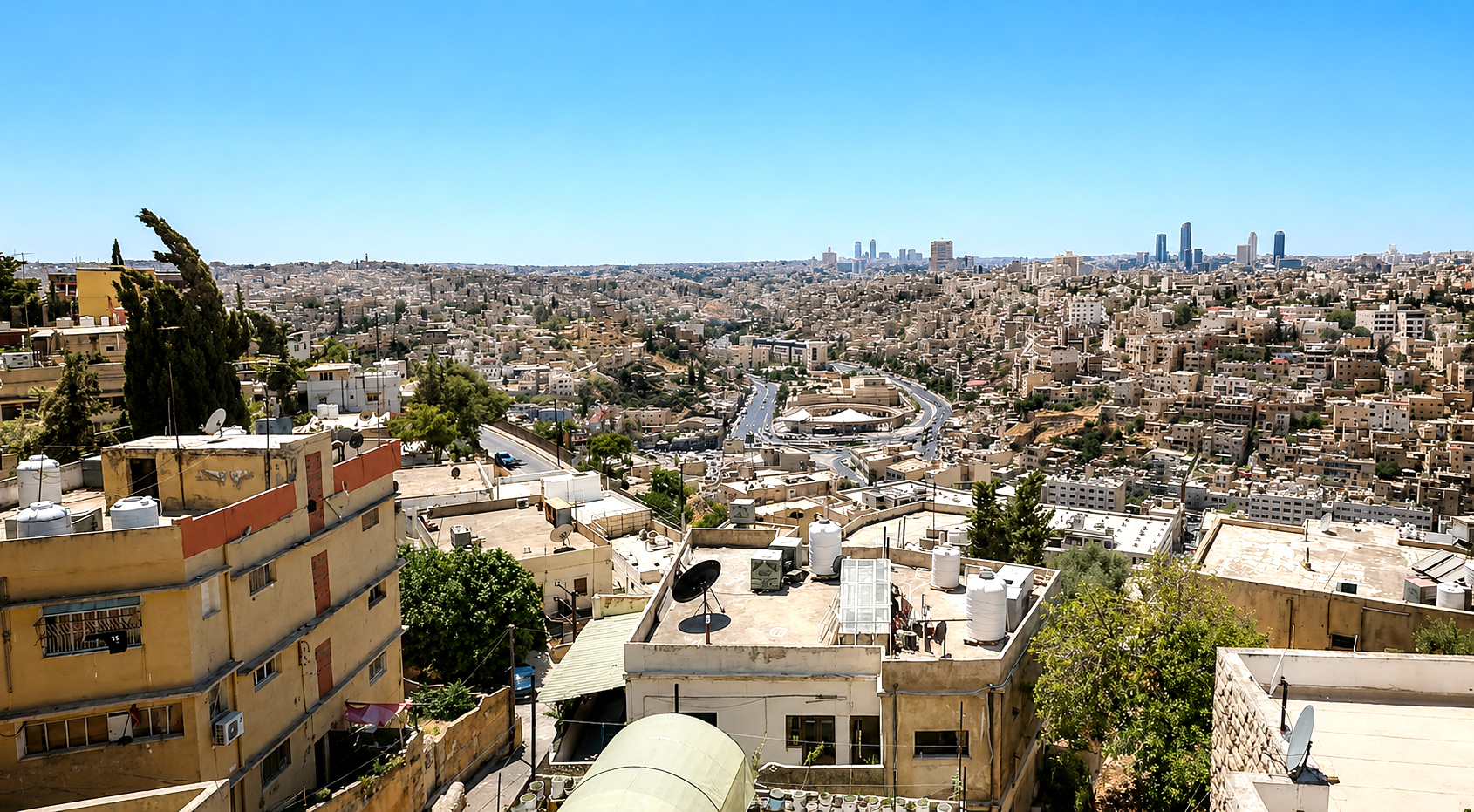
Flat roofs in Amman, Jordan

A flat roof is a roof which is almost level in contrast to the many types of sloped roofs. The slope of a roof is properly known as its pitch and flat roofs have up to approximately 10°. Flat roofs are an ancient form mostly used in arid climates and allow the roof space to be used as a living space or a living roof. Flat roofs, or "low-slope" roofs, are also commonly found on commercial buildings throughout the world. The U.S.-based National Roofing Contractors Association defines a low-slope roof as having a slope of 3 in 12 (1:4) or less.

Flat roofs exist all over the world, and each area has its own tradition or preference for materials used. In warmer climates, where there is less rainfall and freezing is unlikely to occur, many flat roofs are simply built of masonry or concrete and this is good at keeping out the heat of the sun and cheap and easy to build where timber is not readily available. In areas where the roof could become saturated by rain and leak, or where water soaked into the brickwork could freeze to ice and thus lead to 'blowing' (breaking up of the mortar/brickwork/concrete by the expansion of ice as it forms) these roofs are not suitable. Flat roofs are characteristic of the Egyptian, Persian, and Arabian styles of architecture.

Around the world, many modern commercial buildings have flat roofs. The roofs are usually clad with a deeper profile roof sheet (usually 40mm deep or greater). This gives the roof sheet very high water carrying capacity and allows the roof sheets to be more than 100 metres long in some cases. The pitch of this type of roof is usually between 1 and 3 degrees depending upon sheet length.

== Construction methods ==
Any sheet of material used to cover a flat or low-pitched roof is usually known as a membrane and the primary purpose of these membranes is to waterproof the roof area. Materials that cover flat roofs typically allow the water to run off from a slight inclination or camber into a gutter system. Water from some flat roofs such as on garden sheds sometimes flows freely off the edge of a roof, though gutter systems are of advantage in keeping both walls and foundations dry. Gutters on smaller roofs often lead water directly onto the ground, or better, into a specially made soakaway. Gutters on larger roofs usually lead water into the rainwater drainage system of any built up area. Occasionally, however, flat roofs are designed to collect water in a pool, usually for aesthetic purposes, or for rainwater buffering.

Traditionally most flat roofs in the western world make use of felt paper applied over roof decking to keep a building watertight. The felt paper is in turn covered with a flood coat of bitumen (asphalt or tar) and then gravel to keep the sun's heat, ultraviolet light and weather off it and helps protect it from cracking or blistering and degradation. Roof decking is usually of plywood, chipboard or oriented strand board (OSB, also known as Sterling board) of around 18mm thickness, steel or concrete. The mopping of bitumen is applied in two or more coats (usually three or four) as a hot liquid, heated in a kettle. A flooded coat of bitumen is applied over the felts and gravel is embedded in the hot bitumen.

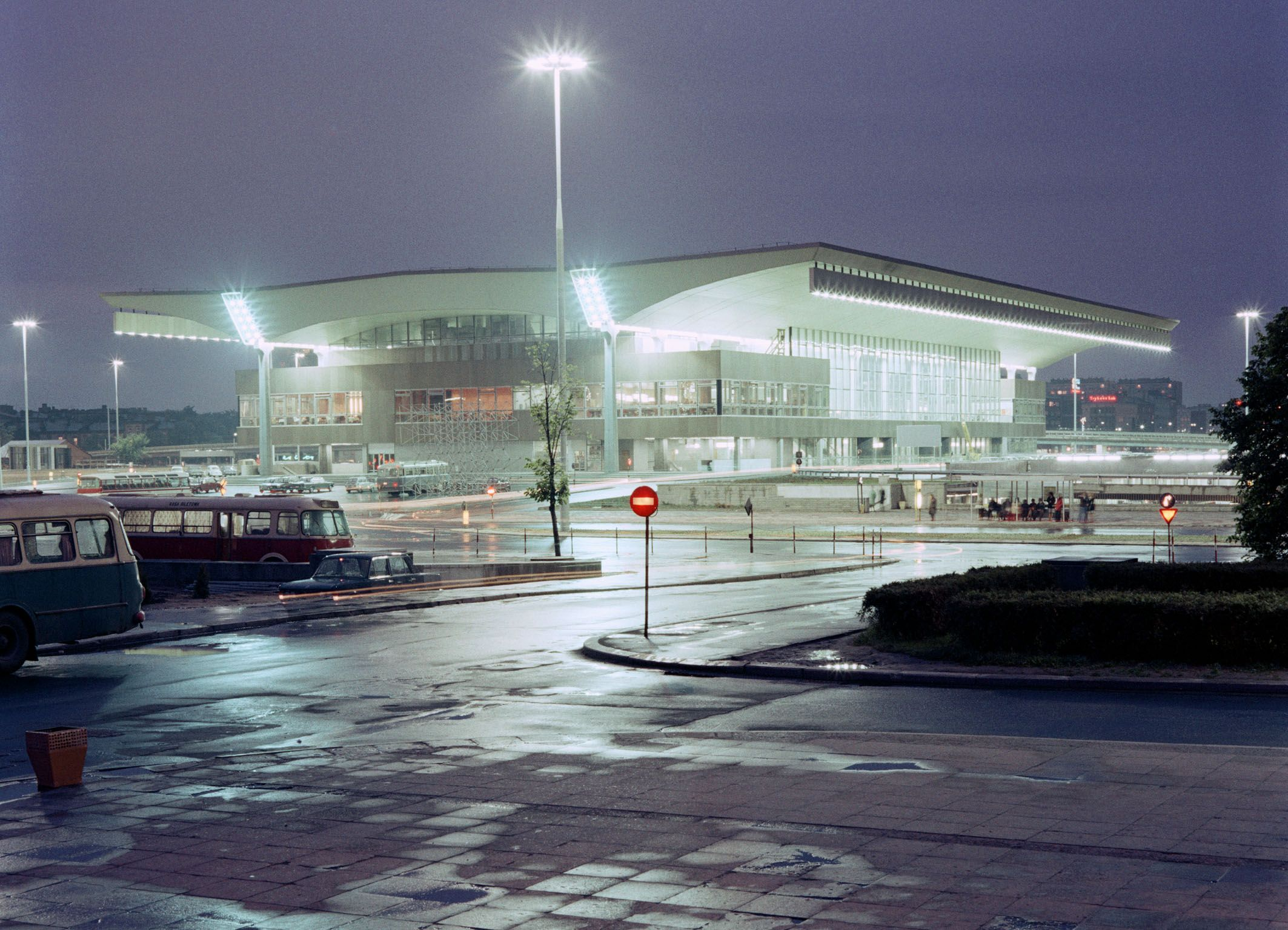
Flat roof in Warszawa Centralna railway station in Poland (1975)

A main reason for failure of these traditional roofs is ignorance or lack of maintenance. The gravel coating protects the tar underneath from breaking down under UV rays from the sun. The gravel can shift from wind, heavy rainfall, or people walking on the roof. This exposes the tar to weather and sun. UV rays lead to material failures such as cracking and blistering, and eventually water gets in.

Roofing felts are usually a 'paper' or fiber material impregnated in bitumen. As gravel cannot protect tarpaper surfaces where they rise vertically from the roof such as on parapet walls or upstands, the felts are usually coated with bitumen and protected by sheet metal flashings called gravel stops. The gravel stop terminates the roofing, preventing water from running underneath the roofing and preventing the gravel surfacing from washing off in heavy rains. In some microclimates or shaded areas felt roofs can last well in relation to the cost of materials purchase and cost of laying them. The cost of membranes such as EPDM rubber has come down over recent years.

If a leak does occur on a flat roof, damage often goes unnoticed for considerable time as water penetrates and soaks the decking and any insulation and/or structure beneath. This can lead to expensive damage from the rot which often develops and if left can weaken the roof structure. There are health risks to people and animals breathing the mold spores: the severity of this health risk remains a debated point. While the insulation is wet, the "R" value is essentially destroyed. If dealing with an organic insulation, the most common solution is removing and replacing the damaged area. If the problem is detected early enough, the insulation may be saved by repairing the leak, but if it has progressed to creating a sunken area, it may be too late.

One problem with maintaining flat roofs is that if water does penetrate the barrier covering, it can travel a long way before causing visible damage or leaking into a building where it can be seen. Thus, it is not easy to find the source of the leak in order to repair it. Once underlying roof decking is soaked, it often sags, creating more room for water to accumulate and further worsening the problem.

Another common reason for failure of flat roofs is lack of drain maintenance where gravel, leaves and debris block water outlets (be they spigots, drains, downpipes or gutters). This causes a pressure head of water (the deeper the water, the greater the pressure) which can force more water into the smallest hole or crack. In colder climates, puddling water can freeze, breaking up the roof surface as the ice expands. It is therefore important to maintain your flat roof to avoid excessive repair.

An important consideration in tarred flat roof quality is knowing that the common term 'tar' applies to rather different products: tar or pitch (which is derived from wood resins), coal tar, asphalt and bitumen. Some of these products appear to have been interchanged in their use and are sometimes used inappropriately, as each has different characteristics, for example whether or not the product can soak into wood, its anti-fungal properties and its reaction to exposure to sun, weather, and varying temperatures.

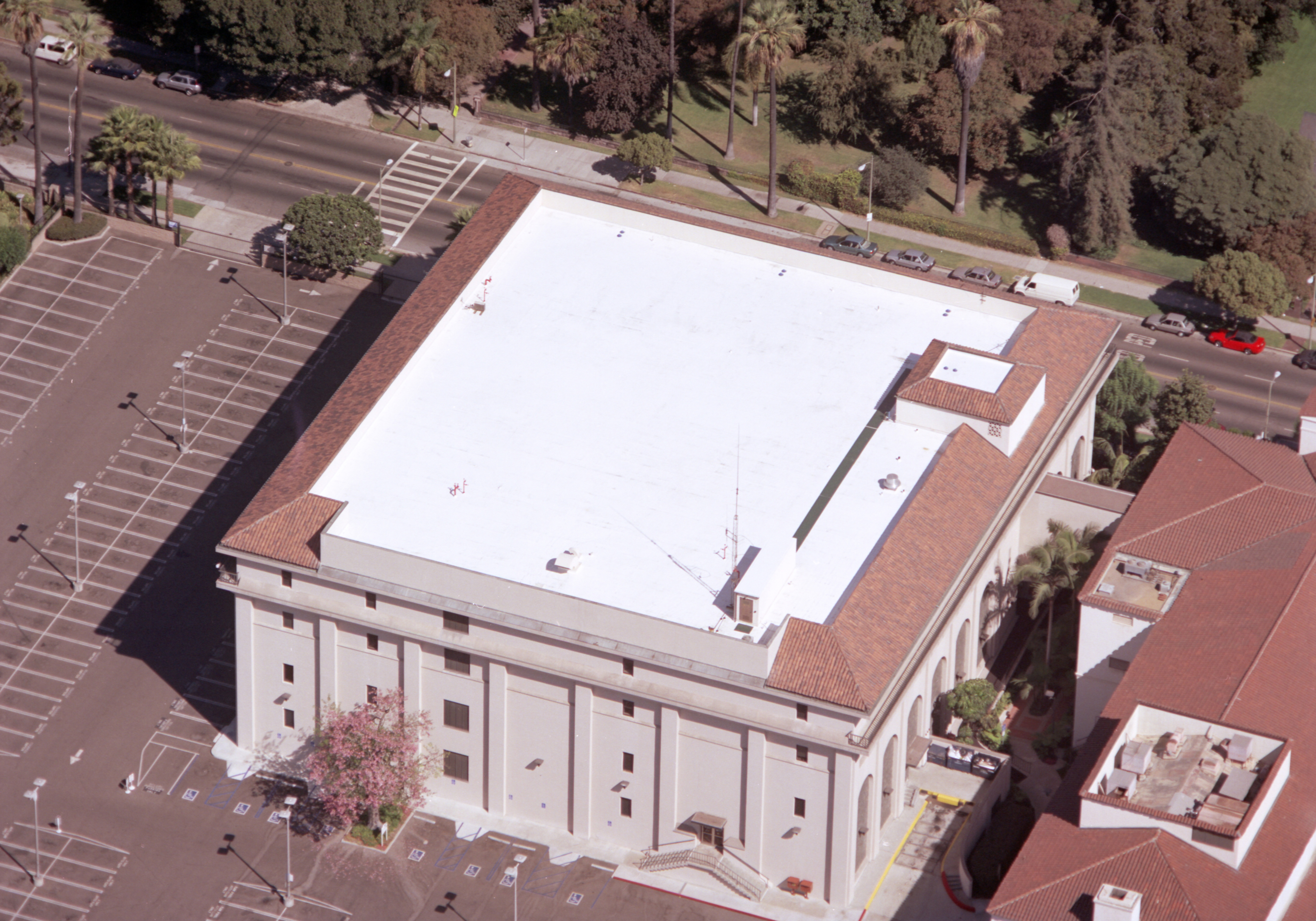
Flat roof in Los Angeles

Modern flat roofs can use single large factory-made sheets such as EPDM synthetic rubber, polyvinyl chloride (PVC), thermoplastic polyolefin (TPO) etc. Although usually of excellent quality, one-piece membranes are called single plies and are used today on many large commercial buildings. Modified bitumen membranes which are widely available in one-meter widths are bonded together in either hot or cold seaming processes during the fitting process, where labor skill and training play a large part in determining the quality of roof protection attained. Reasons for not using one-piece membranes include practicality and cost: on all but the smallest of roofs it can be difficult to lift a huge and heavy membrane (a crane or lift is required) and if there is any wind at all it can be difficult to control and bond the membrane smoothly and properly to the roof.

Detailing of these systems also plays a part in success or failure: In some systems ready-made details (such as internal and external corners, through-roof pipe flashings, cable or skylight flashings etc.) are available from the membrane manufacturer and can be well bonded to the main sheet, whereas with materials such as tar papers this is usually not the case – a fitter has to construct these shapes on-site. Success depends largely on their levels of skill, enthusiasm and training – results can vary hugely. Metals are also used for flat roofs: lead (welded or folded-seamed), tin (folded, soldered or folded-seamed) or copper. These are often expensive options and vulnerable to being stolen and sold as scrap metal.

Flat roofs tend to be sensitive to human traffic. Anything which produces a crack or puncture in the waterproofing membrane can quite readily lead to leaks. Flat roofs can fail, for example; when subsequent work is carried out on the roof, when new through-roof service pipes/cables are installed or when plant such as air conditioning units are installed. A good roofer should be called to make sure the roof is left properly watertight before it is left. In trafficked areas, proper advisory/warning signs should be put up and walkways of rubber matting, wooden or plastic duck-boarding etc. should be installed to protect the roof membrane. On some membranes, even stone or concrete paving can be fitted. For one-off works, old carpet or smooth wooden planks for workers to walk or stand on will usually provide reasonable protection.

Modernist architecture often viewed the flat roof as a living area. Le Corbusier's theoretical works, particularly Vers une Architecture, and the influential Villa Savoye and Unité d'Habitation prominently feature rooftop terraces. That said, Villa Savoye's roof began leaking almost immediately after the Savoye family moved in. Le Corbusier only narrowly avoided a lawsuit from the family because they had to flee the country as France succumbed to the German Army in the Second World War.

== Flat roof developments ==
=== Protected membrane roof ===
A protected membrane roof (PMR) is a roofing system in which thermal insulation or other protective materials are installed above the waterproofing membrane rather than below it. Modern green roofs are commonly classified as a type of protected membrane roof. The development of PMR systems became possible through advances in waterproof membrane technology capable of supporting additional loads, along with moisture-resistant insulation materials. In many PMR applications, rigid panels made of extruded polystyrene are used because of their durability and resistance to water absorption. One of the primary advantages of PMR construction is that the upper protective layers shield the waterproofing membrane from ultraviolet radiation, thermal stress, and physical damage over time. A potential disadvantage of protected membrane roof systems is the additional structural support required to handle ballast weight, rooftop vegetation, or growing media used in green roof installations. However, in temperate climates, flat roofs are often already engineered to accommodate snow loads, making increased structural capacity a common design consideration.

Protected membrane roofs are sometimes referred to in the roofing industry as "IRMA" roofs, for "inverted roof membrane assembly". "IRMA" as a roofing term is a genericized trademark. Originally, "IRMA" was a registered trademark of the Dow Chemical Company and stood for "Insulated Roof Membrane Assembly" and referred to PMRs assembled using Dow brand extruded polystyrene insulation.

=== Green roofs ===
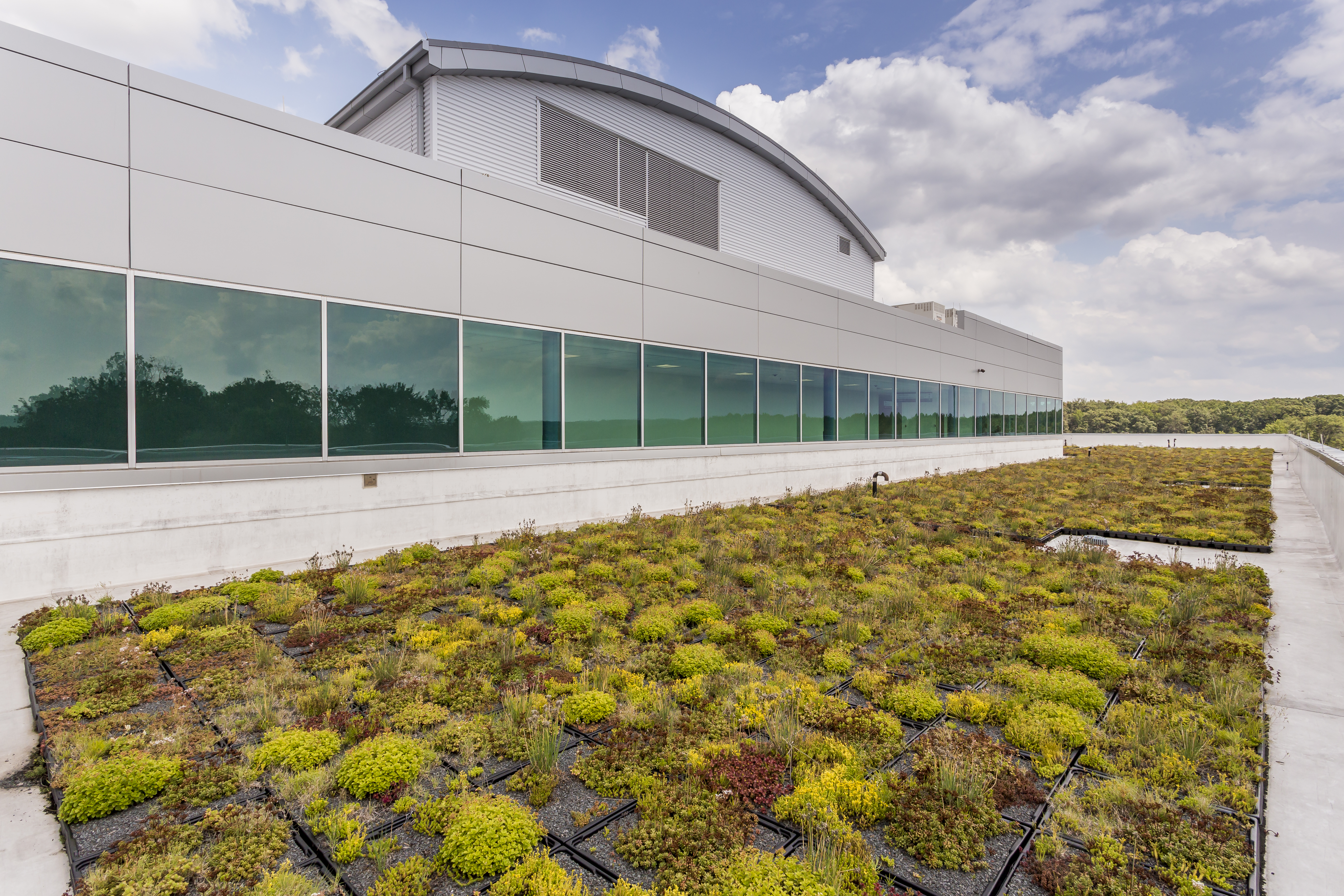
Green roof at Prince George's Community College in Largo, Maryland

Grass or turf roofs have been around since the Viking times if not far earlier and make for a decorative and durable roof covering. Green roofs have been made by depositing topsoil or other growth media on flat roofs and seeding them (or allowing them to self-seed as nature takes its course). Maintenance in the form of simple visible inspection and removal of larger rooting plants allows these roofs to be successful in that they provide an excellent covering and UV light barrier for the roof waterproofing membrane. With some systems, the manufacturer requires that a root barrier membrane be laid above the waterproofing membrane. If well planned and fitted, the mass of the soil or growth medium can provide a good heat buffer for the building – storing the heat of the sun and releasing it into the building at night and thus keeping inside temperatures more even. Sudden cold spells are also buffered from the building.

One predicted problem with large green roofs is that fire may be able to spread rapidly across areas of dry grasses and plants when they are dried, for instance, in summer by hot weather: Various countries stipulate fire barrier areas made of, for example, wide strips of (partly decorative) gravel.

Sedum is emerging as a favorite as it is easily transported and requires little maintenance as it is a succulent plant which remains close to the ground throughout its growth, has mild roots which do not damage the waterproofing membrane and changes colour in the seasons in greens, browns and purples for visual interest.

=== Green-roof water buffering ===
Water run-off and flash floods have become a problem especially in areas where there is a large amount of paving such as in inner cities: When rain falls (instead of draining into the ground over a large area as previously) a rainwater system's pipes take water run-off from huge areas of paving, road surfaces and roof areas – as areas become more and more built up these systems cope less and less well until even a rain-shower can produce backing up of water from pipes which cannot remove the large water volume and flooding occurs. By buffering rainfall, such as by fitting green roofs, floods can be reduced or avoided: the rain is absorbed into the soil/roof medium and runs off the roof bit by bit as the roof becomes soaked.

=== Roof decks ===
A modern (since the 1960s) development in the construction of decks, including flat-roof decks, especially when used as living area or the roof of a commercial structure, is to build a composite steel deck.

== Types of flat roof coverings ==
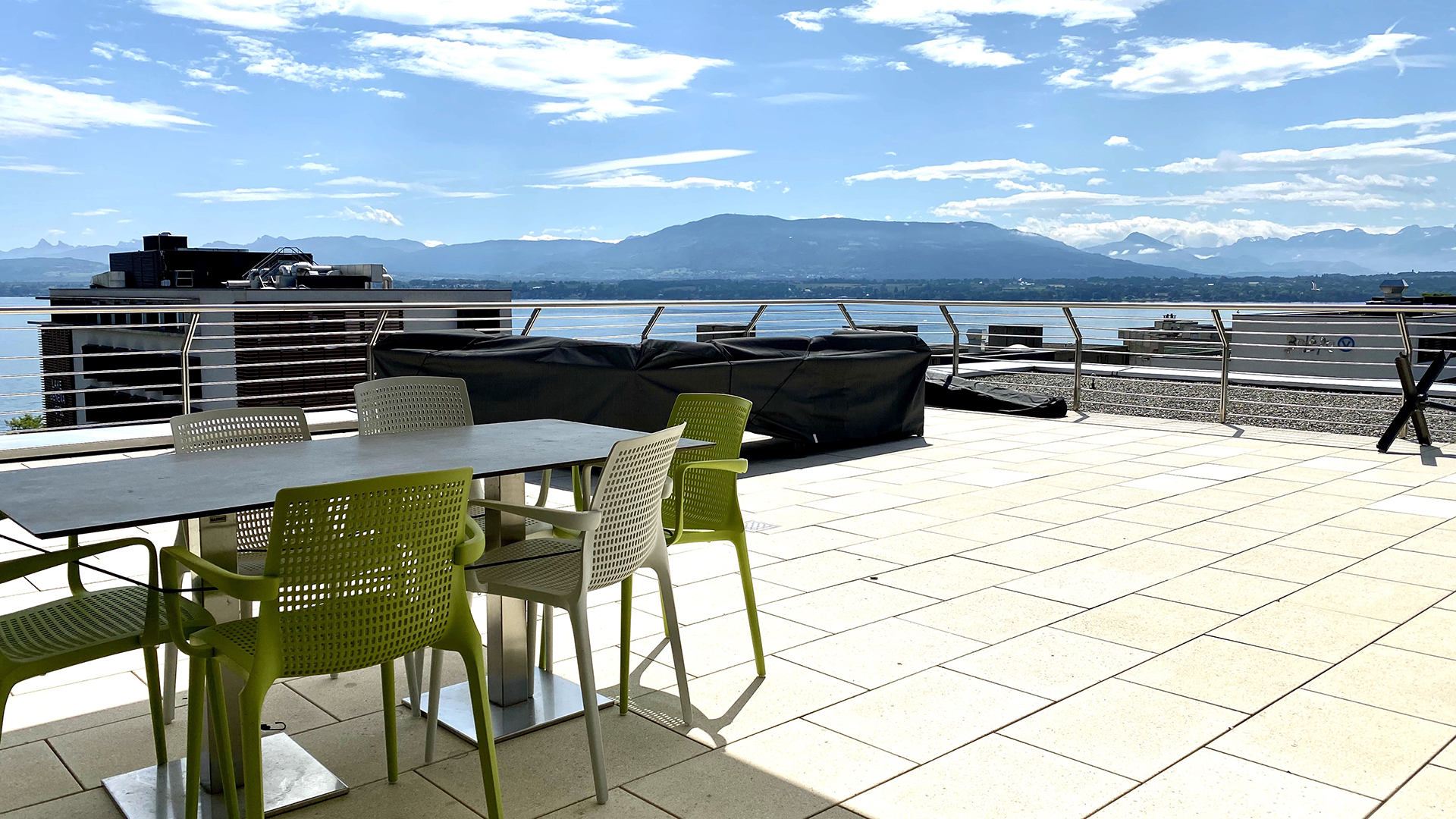
Flat roof of Verisure headquarters at Versoix.

=== Asphalt ===
Asphalt is an aliphatic compound and in almost all cases a byproduct of the oil industry. Some asphalt is manufactured from oil as the intended purpose, and this is limited to high-quality asphalt produced for longer lasting asphalt built-up roofs (BUR). Asphalt ages through photo-oxidation accelerated by heat. As it ages, the asphalts melt point rises and there is a loss of plasticizers. As mass is lost, the asphalt shrinks and forms a surface similar to alligator skin. Asphalt breaks down slowly in water, and the more exposure the more rapid the degradation. Asphalt also dissolves readily when exposed to oils and some solvents.

There are four types of roofing asphalt. Each type is created by heating and blowing with oxygen. The longer the process the higher the melt-point of the asphalt. Therefore, Type I asphalt has characteristics closest to coal tar and can only be used on dead level surfaces. Type II, is considered flat and can be applied to surfaces up to 1/4-in-12 (1:48) slopes. Type III, is considered to be "steep" asphalt but is limited to slopes up to 2 in 12 (1:6), and Type IV is "special steep". The drawback is, the longer it is processed, the shorter the life. Dead-level roofs where Type I asphalt is used as the flood and gravel adhesive perform nearly as well as coal tar. Asphalt roofs are also sustainable by restoring the life cycle by making repairs and recoating with compatible products. The process can be repeated as necessary at a significant cost savings with very little impact on the environment.

Asphalt BUR is made up of multiple layers of reinforcing plies and asphalt forming a redundancy of waterproofing layers. The reflectivity of built up roofs depends on the surfacing material used. Gravel is the most common and they are referred to as asphalt and gravel roofs. Asphalt degradation is a growing concern. UV-rays oxidize the surface of the asphalt and produce a chalk-like residue. As plasticizers leach out of the asphalt, asphalt built-up roofs become brittle. Cracking and alligatoring inevitably follows, allowing water to penetrate the system causing blisters, cracks and leaks. Compared to other systems, installation of asphalt roofs is energy-intensive (hot processes typically use LP gas as the heat source), and contributes to atmospheric air pollution (toxic, and green-house gases are lost from the asphalt during installation).

=== EPDM ===
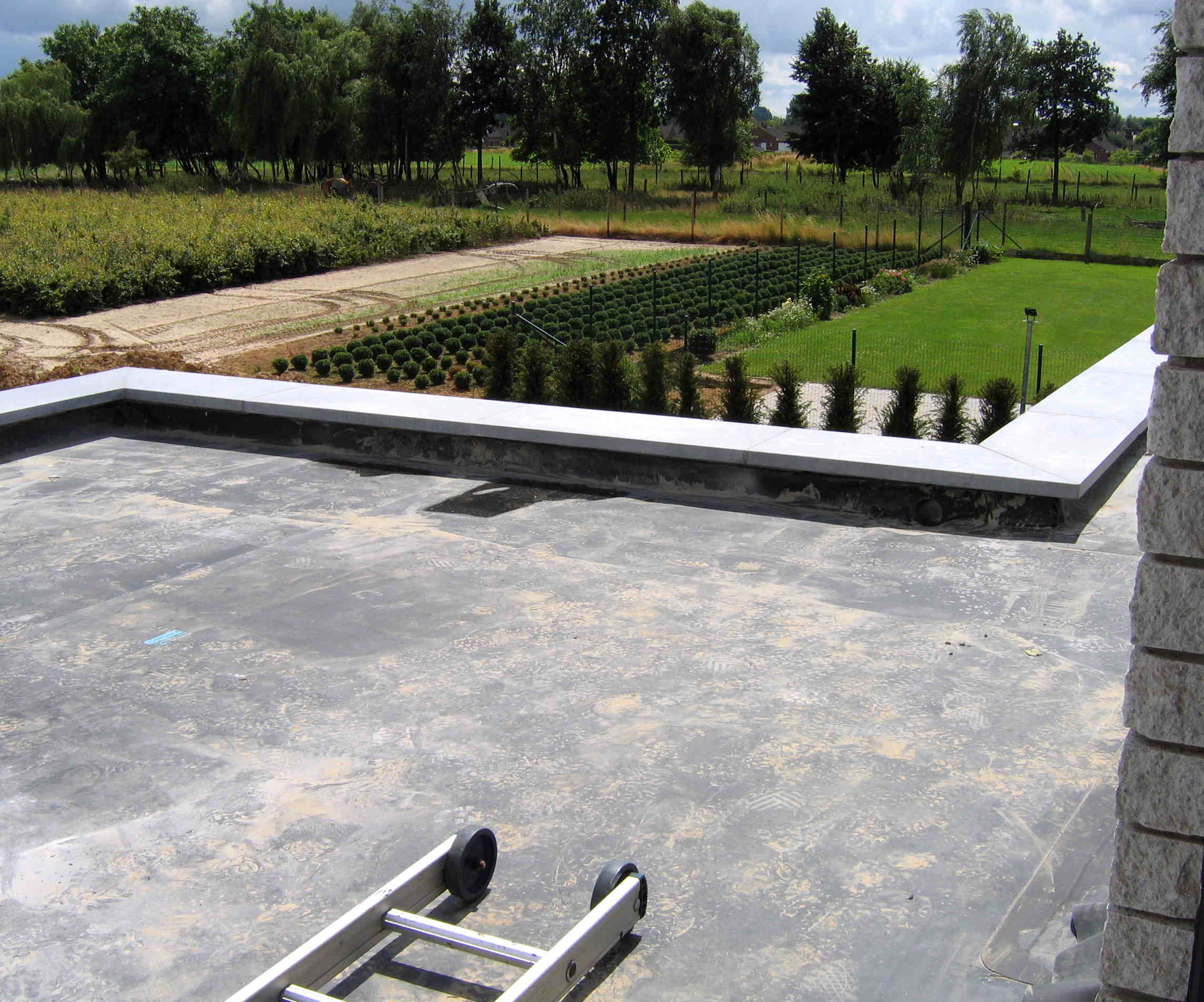
EPDM rubber roof

Ethylene propylene diene monomer rubber (EPDM) is a synthetic rubber most commonly used in single-ply roofing because it is readily available and simple to apply. Seaming and detailing has evolved over the years and is fast, simple and reliable with many membranes including factory applied tape, resulting in a faster installation. The addition of these tapes has reduced labor by as much as 75%.

It is a low-cost membrane, but when properly applied in appropriate places, its warranted life-span has reached 30 years and its expected lifespan has reached 50 years.

There are three installation methods: ballasted, mechanically attached, and fully adhered. Ballasted roofs are held in place by large round stones or slabs. Mechanically attached roof membranes are held in place with nails and are suitable in some applications where wind velocities are not usually high. A drawback is that the nails penetrate the waterproof membrane; if correctly fastened the membrane is "self-gasketing" and will not leak. Fully adhered installation methods give the longest performance of the three methods.

The most advanced EPDM is combined with a polyester fleece backing and fabricated with a patented hot-melt adhesive technology which provides consistent bond strength between the fleece backing and the membrane. This results in largely eliminating shrinkage of the product, whilst still allowing it to stretch up to 300% and move with the building through the seasons. The fleece improves puncture and tear resistance considerably; 1.1-millimetre (45-mil) EPDM with a fleece backing is 180% stronger than 1.5-millimetre (60-mil) bare EPDM. Fleece-backed EPDM has a tear strength of 39.9 kN/m (228 lbf/in) compared to 13.1 kN/m (75 lbf/in) of that without the fleece reinforcement, more than 3 times the strength of non-reinforced membranes.

This thermoset polymer is known for long-term weathering ability and can withstand fluctuations in temperature and ultraviolet rays. They can also be great energy savers.

=== Butynol Roofing ===
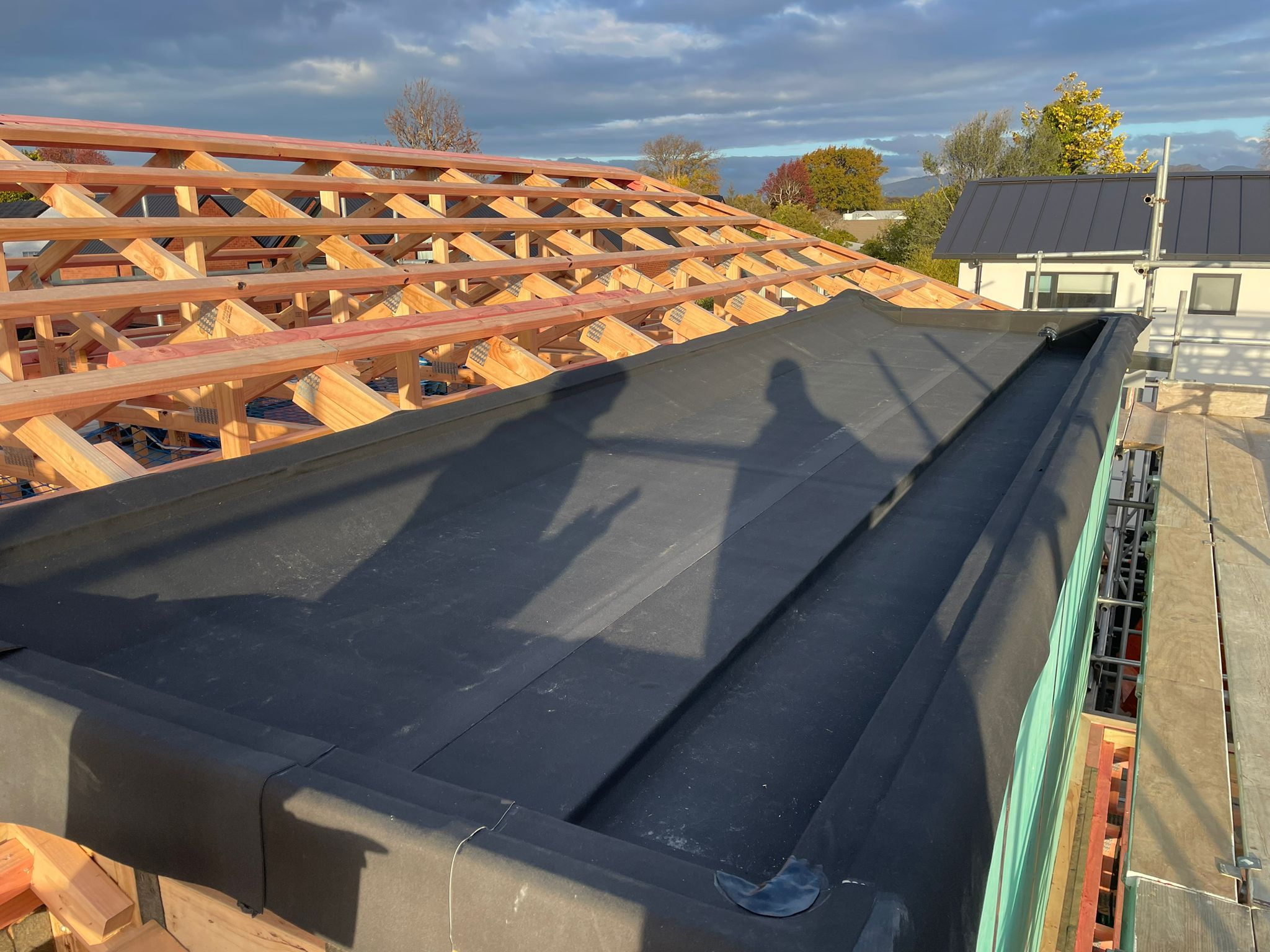
A small Butynol roof installation on a residential flat roof in New Zealand

Butynol roofing is a type of roofing material made from synthetic rubber, specifically butyl rubber. It is widely used in New Zealand and other parts of the world for flat and low-slope roofs due to its exceptional durability, flexibility, and waterproofing capabilities.

Key Features of Butynol Roofing

- Durability: Butynol is known for its long lifespan and ability to withstand harsh weather conditions, including heavy rain, strong winds, and UV exposure.
- Flexibility: The material remains flexible over time, allowing it to accommodate the natural movements of a building and preventing cracks and leaks.
- Waterproofing: Butynol forms a continuous membrane that effectively seals the roof, preventing water penetration and damage.
- Chemical Resistance: It is resistant to many chemicals, enhancing its durability and suitability for various applications, including industrial and commercial buildings.

Butynol Roll Sizes and Weights

Butynol roofing membranes are available in different sizes and weights to accommodate various needs:

17.86m roll x 1.0mm (30 kg) Black 17.86m roll x 1.5mm (45 kg) Black and Grey

Butynol Roofing Usage

Butynol is widely used in roofing applications, favored in New Zealand for flat roofs due to its durability and flexibility., particularly for flat and low-slope roofs, due to its excellent properties that cater to the demanding requirements of modern construction.

=== CPE and CSPE ===
Chlorosulfonated polyethylene (CSPE) and chlorinated polyethylene (CPE) are nonvulcanized synthetic rubber roofing materials that were used for roofing materials from 1964 until their almost complete removal/disappearance from the market in 2011. It is more popularly known and referred to as Hypalon. The product is usually reinforced, and depending upon manufacturer, seams can be heat welded (when both membranes were brand new) or adhered with a solvent-based adhesive.

Over time, however, the materials cure and gain properties similar to most thermoset materials such as neoprene or EPDM. After environmental concerns in the late 1990s companies began to feel pressured regarding some of the common adhesives and bonding chemicals, and some jurisdictions passed regulations limiting the use of CSPE membranes. this caused many manufacturers to scramble to create new ways to manufacture the roofing materials, raising costs as well as concerns regarding longevity.

In June 2009, DuPont, the manufacturer of Hypalon, discontinued the product, followed within a couple years by nearly every major manufacturer. As a result, CSPE and CPE are no longer available in the US as a full roof membrane, and repair materials are extremely rare or expensive compared to other membranes.

=== Modified bitumen ===
Modified bitumen membranes are hybrid roof systems that combine the high technology formulation and prefabrication benefits of single-ply with the traditional roofing installation techniques used in built-up roofing. The membranes consist of factory-fabricated layers of asphalt, modified using a plastic or rubber ingredient and combined with a reinforcement.

The final modified bitumen sheet goods are typically installed by heating the underside of the roll with a torch, presenting a significant fire hazard. For this reason, the technique was outlawed in some municipalities when buildings caught fire, some burning to the ground. This problem was alleviated by strict specifications requiring installation training and certification as well as on-site supervision. Another problem developed when a lack of standards allowed a manufacturer to produce the product with insufficient APP, requisite to enhancing the system aging characteristics.

A bitumen is a term applied to both coal tar pitch and asphalt products. Modified bitumens were developed in Europe in the 1970s when Europeans became concerned with the lower performance standards of roofing asphalt. Modifiers were added to replace the plasticizers that had been removed by advanced methods in the distillation process. The two most common modifiers are atactic polypropylene (APP) from Italy and styrene-butadiene-styrene (SBS) from France. The United States started developing modified bitumen compounds in the late 1970s and early 1980s.

APP was added to asphalt to enhance aging characteristics and was applied to polyester, fiberglass, or polyester and fiberglass membranes to form a sheet good, cut in manageable lengths for handling.

SBS is used as a modifier for enhancing substandard asphalt and provides a degree of flexibility much like rubber. It also is applied to a myriad of carriers and produced as a sheet-good in rolls that can be easily handled.

Styrene ethylene butadiene styrene (SEBS) is a formulation increasing flexibility of the sheet and longevity.

Styrene-isoprene-styrene (SIS) is another modifier used commercially. SIS-modified bitumen is rarely used, is used primarily in self-adhering sheets, and has very small market share.

=== Cold-applied liquid membranes ===
A choice for new roofs and roof refurbishment. This type of a roof membrane is generally referred to as liquid roofing and involves the application of a cold liquid roof coating. No open flames or other heat sources (as are required with torch on felts) are needed and the glass fiber reinforced systems provide seamless waterproofing around roof protrusions and details. Systems are based on flexible thermoset resin systems such as polyester and polyurethane, and poly(methyl methacrylate) (PMMA). It is important that the membrane is not applied too thin like a paint otherwise failure will result.

In the United Kingdom, liquid coatings are the fastest growing sector of the flat roof refurbishment market. Between 2005 and 2009 the UK's leading manufacturers reported a 70% increase in the roof area covered by the coating systems supplied. Cold-applied liquid rubber offers similar benefits to thermoset resin systems with the added benefit of being quick to apply and having high elasticity. Although it is comparatively new to the UK market it has been used successfully in the US market for 20 years. However, EPDM is not an easy substrate to adhere to as is any polyolefin so applying liquid membranes over EPDM is not easy.

When applying a liquid membrane it is possible to embed glass fiber matting so that the resultant cured membrane is considerably toughened.

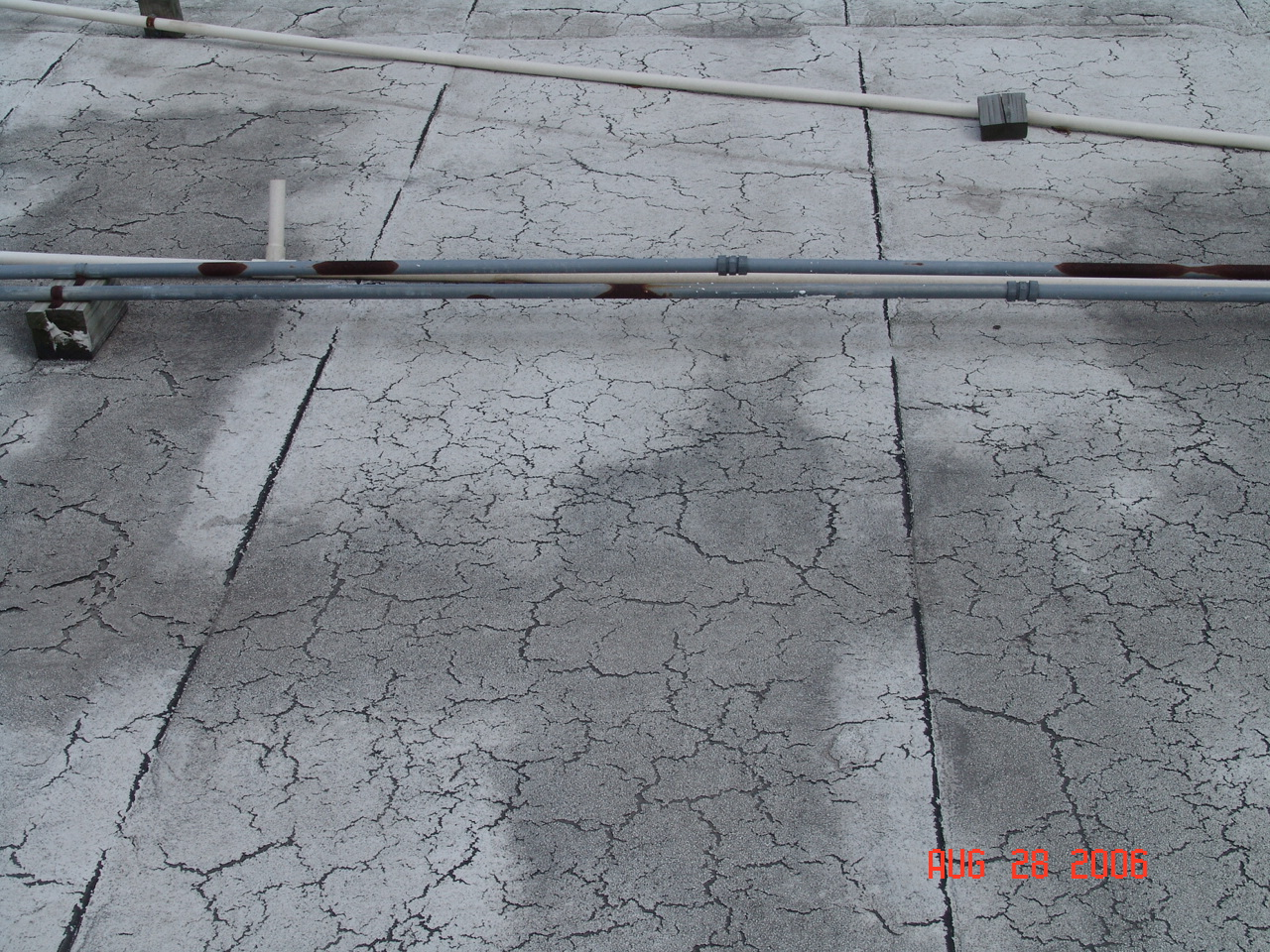
Liquid membrane applied too thinly over a flat roof resulting in very early failure

=== PVC (vinyl) membrane roofing ===
Polyvinyl chloride (PVC) membrane roofing is also known as vinyl roofing. Vinyl is derived from two simple ingredients: fossil fuel and salt. Petroleum or natural gas is processed to make ethylene, and salt is subjected to electrolysis to separate out the natural element chlorine. Ethylene and chlorine are combined to produce ethylene dichloride (EDC), which is further processed into a gas called vinyl chloride monomer (VCM).

In the next step, known as polymerization, the VCM molecule forms chains, converting the gas into a fine, white powder – vinyl resin – which becomes the basis for the final process, compounding. In compounding, vinyl resin may be blended with additives such as stabilizers for durability, plasticizers for flexibility and pigments for color.

PVC roofing is a Thermoplastic system, meaning that it is heat-welded at the seams forming a permanent, watertight bond that is typically stronger than the membrane itself.

PVC resin is modified with plasticizers and UV stabilizers, and reinforced with fiberglass non-woven mats or polyester woven scrims, for use as a flexible roofing membrane. PVC is, however, subject to plasticizer migration (a process by which the plasticizers migrate out of the sheet causing it to become brittle). Thus, a thicker membrane has a larger reservoir of plasticizer to maintain flexibility over its lifespan. PVC is often blended with other polymers to add to the performance capabilities of the original PVC formulation, such as KEE – Ketone Ethylene Ester. Such blends are referred to as either a CPA – Copolymer Alloy or a TPA – Tripolymer Alloy.

Vinyl roofs provide an energy-efficient roofing option due to their inherently light coloring. While the surface of a black roof can experience a temperature increase of as much as 50 °C (90 °F) under the heat of the full sun, a white reflective roof typically increases only 5 to 14 °C (9 to 25 °F). Studies have even shown that a black PVC, which is often as much as 60 °F hotter than its white counterpart, will still be as much as 40 °F cooler than black asphalt or EPDM roofs.

Vinyl membranes can also be used in waterproofing applications for roofing. This is a common technique used in association with green, or planted, roofs.

=== TPO ===
Thermoplastic polyolefin (TPO) single-ply roofing is the single most popular type of commercial low-slope roof covering as of 2016. A TPO roof membrane consists of three layers: a TPO polymer base, a polyester reinforcement scrim middle layer, and a TPO polymer top ply, which are heat-fused at the factory. TPO roof membranes typically come in three standard thicknesses: 45-mil, 60-mil, and 80-mil. Standard TPO membrane colors are white, grey, and tan, with custom colors also available from most manufacturers. The most popular color for a TPO roof is white, due to the reflective, "cool roof" properties of white TPO. Using white roofing material helps reduce the "heat island effect" and solar heat gain in the building.

Although TPO exhibits the positive characteristics of other thermoplastics, it does not have any plasticizers added to the product like other thermoplastics. This mis categorization made sense when the product was introduced in the early 1990s and was unproven in the industry. TPO was categorized with thermoplastic membranes that were similar in look and performance but were far from their real chemical and physical characteristics of the TPO membrane. Having no plasticizers and chemically being closer to rubber but having better seam, puncture, and tear strength, TPO was touted to be a white weldable rubber of the future. From 2007 to 2012, reported sales of TPO roofing products by all six major U.S. manufacturers showed materials and accessories sales quadrupling those of all other flat roofing materials.

TPO roofing systems feature strong seams that are heat-welded, providing superior seam strength and reducing the risk of leaks compared to other roofing systems with adhesive or tape seams.

A TPO roof system can be fully adhered, mechanically fastened, or ballasted, although TPO roof systems are rarely ballasted, since the ballast covers up the surface of the roof and negates the reflective property of white TPO. TPO seam strengths are reported to be three to four times higher than EPDM roofing systems. This is a popular choice for "green" building as there are no plasticizers added and TPO has very low degradation under UV radiation.

FPO vs TPO

Flexible thermo polyolefin is the exact physical and chemical name given to the product commonly known in the industry as TPO (thermoplastic olefin).

=== Thermosets vs Thermoplastics ===
Thermoset roof systems that are bonded together using chemicals or adhesives, as opposed to heat welded systems like Thermoplastics. The majority of thermoset roofs are typically EPDM (ethylene propylene diene monomer) rubber, although CPE, Neoprene, and other Thermoset roof systems exist. Thermoset roofing is easily formed around shapes like corners and is extremely resistant to ozone, ultraviolet light, weathering, high heat, and abrasion damage, making it an excellent roofing material. EPDM membranes are seamed using pressure-sensitive tapes to join two sheets together, although other Thermoset systems can often be chemically bonded, such as CPE and CSPE membranes.

Alternatively, Thermoplastic Roof Systems are systems that are bonded through heat-welding, creating what is usually a stronger and more durable bond. Population Thermoplastic Roofing Systems include TPO and PVC, which together make up over 90% of thermoplastic roofing membranes. While more difficult to form into unique shapes, they instead offer greater bonding strength and longevity compared to thermoset roofing, although they often require specialized training and tools.

=== Coal-tar pitch built-up roof ===
Coal tar is an aromatic hydrocarbon and a by-product from the coking process of the coal industry. It is historically in abundance where coal is used in steel manufacturing. It ages very slowly through volatilization and is an excellent waterproofing and oil resistant product. Roofs are covered by heating the coal tar and applying it between layers of tar paper. It is typically limited to applications on dead level or flat roofs with slopes of 1/4 in 12 (1:48) or less. It is the only roofing material permitted by the International Building Code to be applied to slopes below 1/4 in 12; the code allows its use on roofs with slopes as low as 1/8 in 12 (1:96). It has a tendency to soften in warm temperatures and "heal" itself. It is typically surfaced with gravel to protect the roof from UV rays, hail, and foot traffic, as well as for fire protection. Coal tar provides an extremely long life cycle that is sustainable and renewable. It takes energy to manufacture and to construct a roof with it but its proven longevity with periodic maintenance provides service for many years, with ages from 50 to 70 years not uncommon, with some now performing for over a century. Currently, there are cold process (no kettle is used) coal tar pitch products that almost eliminate all fumes associated with its typical hot process version.

Coal tar pitch is often confused with asphalt and asphalt with coal tar pitch. Although they are both black and both are melted in a kettle when used in roofing, that is where the similarity stops.

=== Glass-reinforced plastic ===
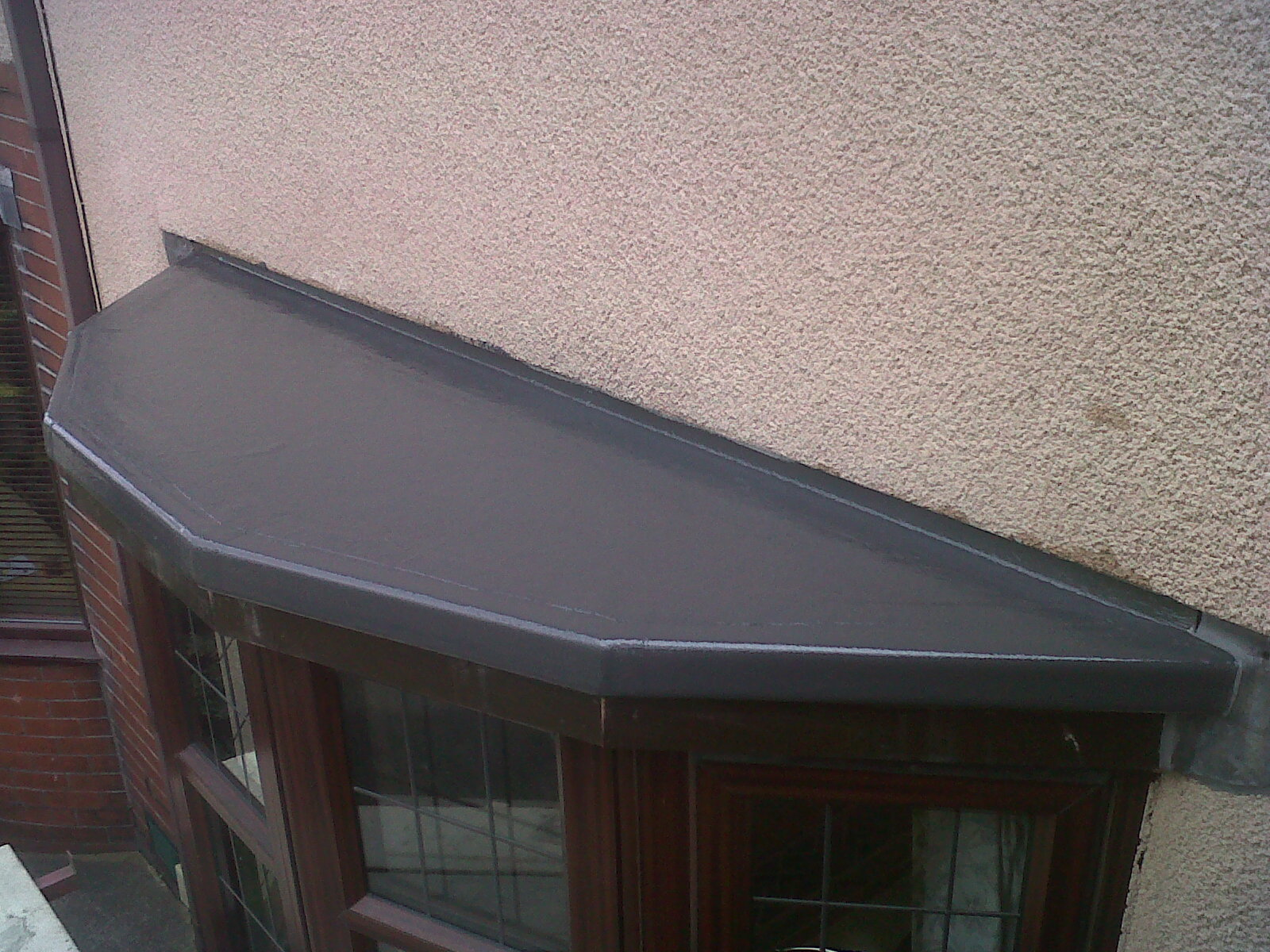
GRP fiberglass flat roofing

A glass-reinforced plastic (GRP) roof is a single-ply GRP laminate applied in situ over a good-quality conditioned plywood or oriented strand board (OSB) deck. The roof is finished with pre-formed GRP edge trims and a coat of pre-pigmented topcoat.

The durability and lightweight properties of GRP make it the ideal construction material for applications as diverse as lorry aerofoils and roofs, boats, ponds and automotive body panels. GRP is also used in hostile industrial settings for applications such as tanks and underground pipes; this is due to its ability to withstand high temperatures and its resistance to chemicals.

Unlike other roofing materials, GRP is not really a roofing material and has properties that render it better suited to small craft construction. It is often used on small domestic installations, but usually fails prematurely when used on larger projects. As well as being an inexpensive material, it is robust, inflexible and will never corrode.

=== Metal flat roofing ===
Metal is one of the few materials that can be used for both pitched roofs and flat roofs. Flat or low-slope roofs can be covered with steel, aluminum, zinc, or copper just like pitched roofs. However, metal shingles are not practical for flat roofing and so roofers recommend standing-seam and screw-down metal panels. While metal can be an expensive option in the short term, superior durability and simple maintenance of metal roofs typically saves money in the long term. A study by Ducker International in 2005 identified the average cost per year of a metal roof to be US$3.2 per square metre ($0.30/ft^{2}) while single-ply roofs stood at $6.1/m^{2} ($0.57/ft^{2}) and built-up roofing at $4.0/m^{2} ($0.37/ft^{2}).

Metal roofs are also one of the most environmentally sound roofing options, with most metal roofing material already containing 30-60% recycled content, and the product itself being 100% recyclable. The value of recyclable scrap metal can also provide a benefit to the homeowner; upon roof replacement, scrap metal from the old roof can be sold to recoup a potentially large share of original material costs.

== Benefits, and uses, and drawbacks ==
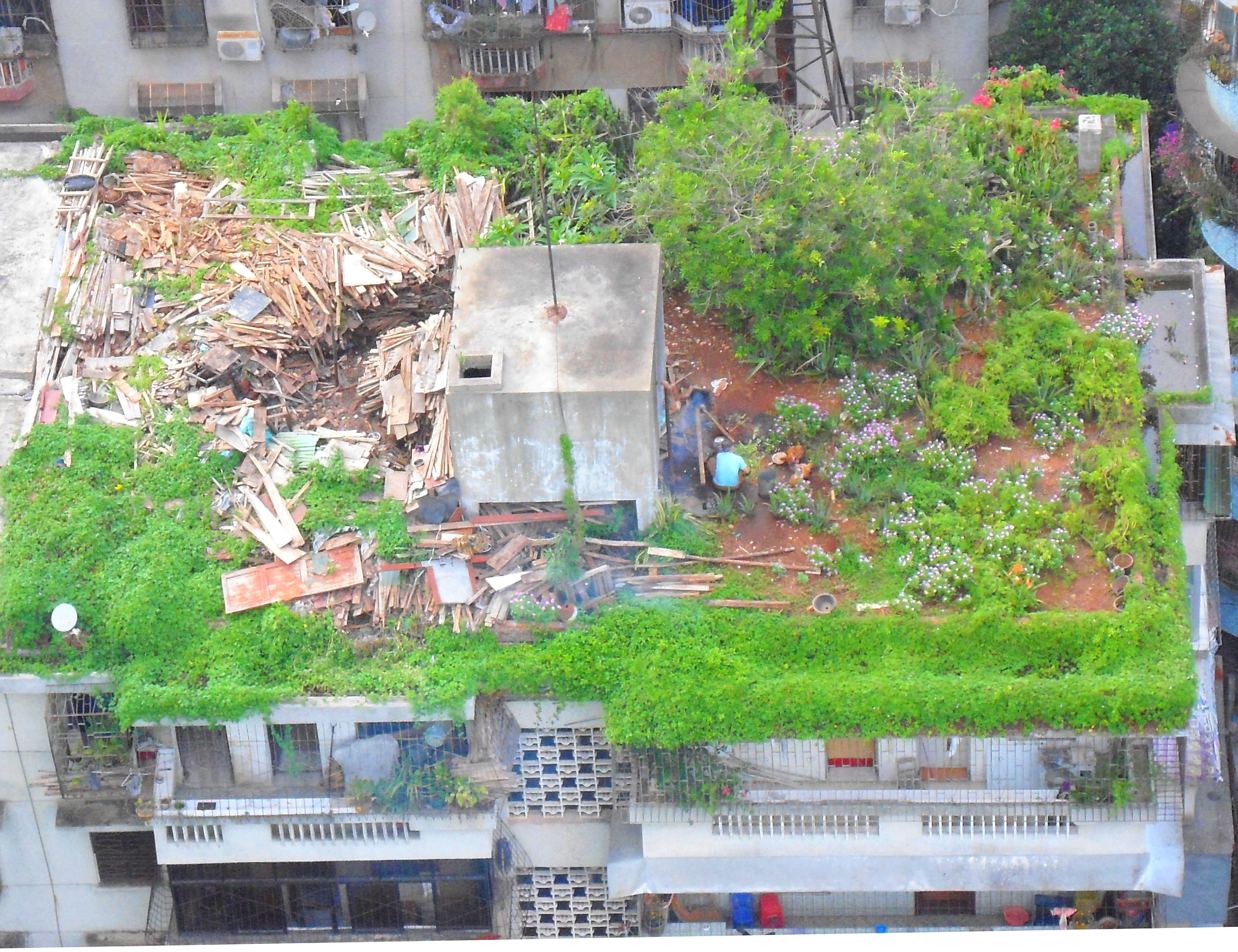
A rooftop in Haikou, Hainan, China, being used as a garden, storage area for wood, chicken run, and barbecue area

This style roof provides space for rooftop mechanical equipment, solar panels or outdoor recreational use such as roof gardens. Applying a tough waterproofing membrane forms the ideal substrate for green roof planting schemes. Depending on the framing system used, flat roofs can use less material and are easier to install (in the case of concrete or steel framing) or can be more expensive in terms of materials and installation (typically with timber or cold formed steel).

Where gable roofs are uncommon or space is limited, flat roofs may be used as living spaces, with sheltered kitchens, bathrooms, living and sleeping areas. In third world countries, such roof tops are commonly used as areas to dry laundry, for storage, and even as a place to raise livestock. Other uses include pigeon coops, helipads, sports areas (such as tennis courts), and restaurants outdoor seating.

While flat roofs are usually designed to shed water, they may still be prone to water ponding, such as from snowmelt. Flat roofs are also more prone to uplift from high winds than are hip or mansard roofs. Flat roofs also have less volume, resulting in less available space for storage, mechanical and electrical equipment, and insulation.

== Maintenance and assessment ==
Some assessors use 10 years as an average life cycle, although this is dependent on the type of flat roof system in place. Some old tar and gravel roofers acknowledge that unless a roof has been neglected for too long and there are many problems in many areas, a BUR (a built up roof of tar, paper and gravel) will last 20–30 years. Despite these assessors, the actual averages when studied come closer to 12–27, depending on the roof type, with some roofs lasting as long as 120 years. There are BUR systems in place dating to the early 1900s.

Modern cold applied liquid membranes have been durability rated by the British Board of Agrément (BBA) for 30 years. BBA approval is a benchmark in determining the suitability of a particular fiberglass roofing system. If standard fiberglass polyester resin is used such as the same resin used in boat repairs, then there will be problems with the roof being too inflexible and not able to accommodate expansion and contraction of the building. A fit-for-purpose flexible/elastomeric resin system used as a waterproofing membrane will last for many years with just occasional inspection needed. The fact that such membranes do not require stone chippings to deflect heat means there is lower risk of stones blocking drains. Liquid applied membranes are also naturally resistant to moss and lichen.

General flat roof maintenance includes getting rid of ponding water, typically within 48 hours. This is accomplished by adding roof drains or scuppers for a pond at an edge or automatic siphons for ponds in the center of roofs. An automatic siphon can be created with an inverted ring-shaped sprinkler, a garden hose, a wet/dry vacuum, a check valve installed in the vacuum, and a digital timer. The timer runs two or three times a day for a minute or two to start water in the hose. The timer then turns off the vacuum, but the weight of water in the hose continues the siphon and soon opens the check valve in the vacuum. The best time to address the issue of ponding water is during the design phase of a new roofing project when sufficient falls can be designed-in to take standing water away. The quicker the water is got off the roof, the less chance there is for a roof leak to occur.

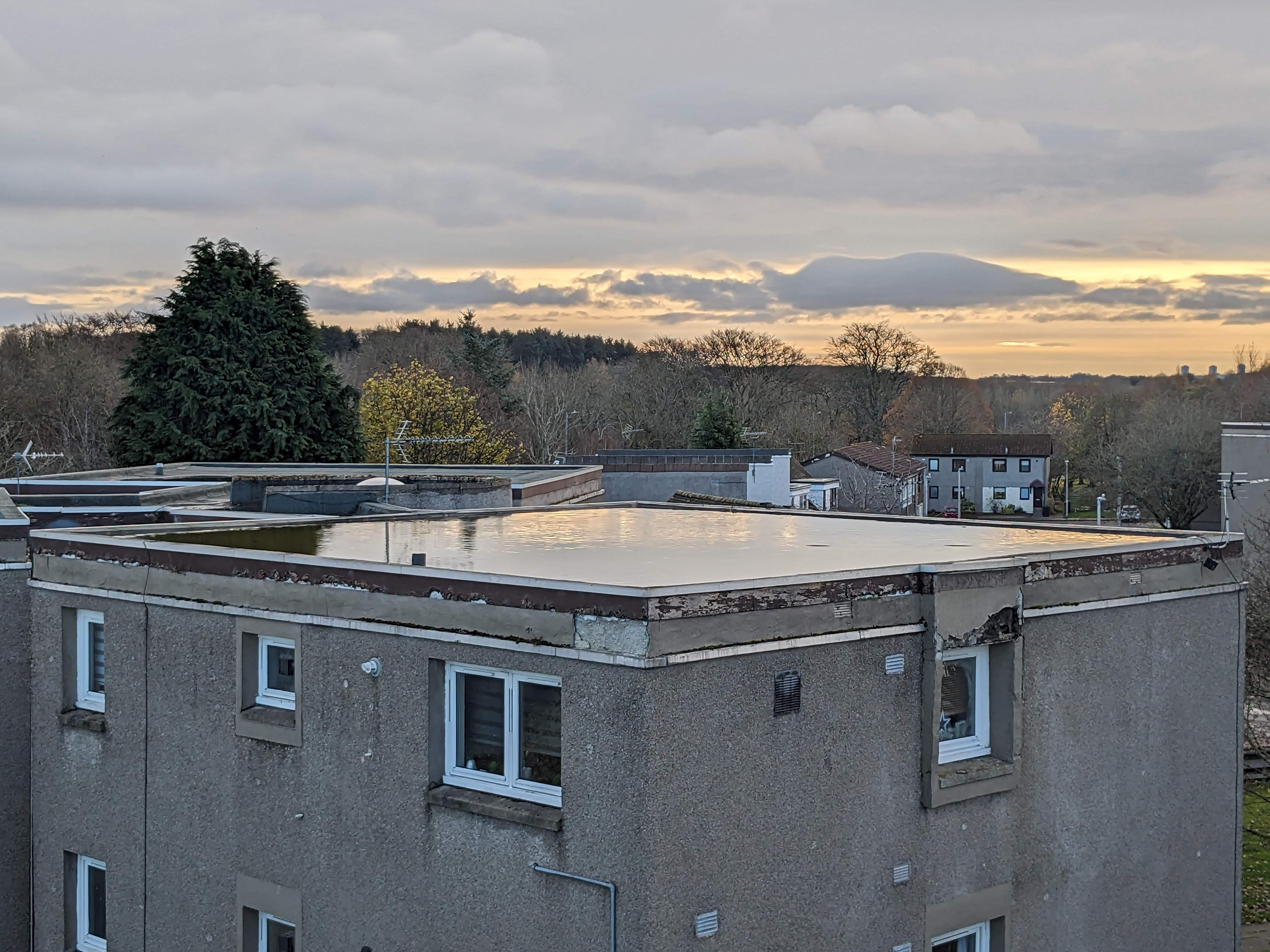
A clogged flat roof drain causing water to pond.

All roofs should be inspected semi-annually and after major storms. Particular attention should be paid to the flashings around all of the rooftop penetrations. The sharp bends at such places can open up and need to be sealed with plastic cement, mesh and a small mason's trowel. Additionally, repairs to lap seams in the base flashings should be made. 90% of all roof leaks and failure occur at the flashings. Another important maintenance item, often neglected, is to simply keep the roof drains free of debris. A clogged roof drain will cause water to pond, leading to increased "dead load" weight on building that may not be engineered to accommodate that weight. Additionally, ponding water on a roof can freeze. Often, water finds its way into a flashing seam and freezes, weakening the seam.

For bitumen-based roof coverings maintenance also includes keeping the tar paper covered with gravel, an older method, currently being replaced with bituminous roofing membranes and the like, which must be 'glued' in place so wind and waves do not move it causing scouring and more bare spots. The glue can be any exterior grade glue like driveway coating.

Maintenance also includes fixing blisters (delaminations) or creases that may not yet be leaking but will leak over time. They may need experienced help as they require scraping away the gravel on a cool morning when the tar is brittle, cutting open, and covering with plastic cement or mastic and mesh. Any moisture trapped in a blister has to be dried before being repaired.

Roof coatings can be used to fix leaks and extend the life of all types of flat roofs by preventing degradation by the sun (ultra-violet radiation). A thickness of 0.75 millimetres (30 mils) is often used and once it is fully cured, a seamless, watertight membrane is created.

Infrared thermography is being used to take pictures of roofs at night to find trouble spots. When the roof is cooling, wet spots not visible to the naked eye, continue to emit heat. The infrared cameras read the heat that is trapped in sections of wet insulation.

== Cool roofs ==
Roofing systems that can deliver high solar reflectance (the ability to reflect the visible, infrared and ultraviolet wavelengths of the sun, reducing heat transfer to the building) and high thermal emittance (the ability to release a large percentage of absorbed, or non-reflected solar energy) are called cool roofs. Cool roofs fall into one of these three categories: inherently cool, green planted roofs or coated with a cool material.

- Inherently cool roofs: Roof membranes made of white or light colored material are inherently reflective and achieve some of the highest reflectance and emittance measurements of which roofing materials are capable. A roof made of thermoplastic white vinyl, for example, can reflect 80% or more of the sun's rays and emit at least 70% of the solar radiation that the building absorbs. An asphalt roof only reflects between 6 and 26% of solar radiation, resulting in greater heat transfer to the building interior and greater demand for air conditioning – a strain on both operating costs and the electric power grid.
- Green planted roofs: A green roof is a roof that is partially or completely covered with vegetation and a growing medium, planted over a waterproofing membrane. A green roof typically consists of many layers, including an insulation layer; a waterproof membrane, often vinyl; a drainage layer, usually made of lightweight gravel, clay, or plastic; a geotextile or filter mat that allows water to soak through but prevents erosion of fine soil particles; a growing medium; plants; and, sometimes, a wind blanket. Green roofs are classified as either intensive or extensive, depending on the depth of planting medium and amount of maintenance required. Traditional roof gardens, which are labor-intensive and require a reasonable depth of soil to grow large plants are considered intensive, while extensive green roofs are nearly self-sustaining and require less maintenance.
- Coated roofs: One way to make an existing or new roof reflective is by applying a specifically designed white roof coatings (not simply white paint) on the roof's surface. The coating can be Energy Star rated. Reflectivity and emissivity ratings for reflective roof products available in the United States can be found in the Cool Roof Rating Council website.

Cool roofs offer both immediate and long-term savings in building energy costs. Inherently cool roofs, coated roofs and planted or green roofs can:

- Reduce building heat-gain, as a white or reflective roof typically increases only 5–14 °C (9–25 °F) above ambient temperature during the day
- Enhance the life expectancy of both the roof membrane and the building's cooling equipment.
- Improve thermal efficiency of the roof insulation; this is because as temperature increases, the thermal conductivity of the roof's insulation also increases.
- Reduce the demand for electric power by as much as 10 percent on hot days.
- Reduce resulting air pollution and greenhouse gas emissions.
- Provide energy savings, even in northern climates on sunny (not necessarily "hot") days.

== See also ==
- Roof pitch
- List of roof shapes
- Bituminous waterproofing
