= John Smith House (Kingston, New York) =

Historic house in New York, United States

- U.S. National Register of Historic Places
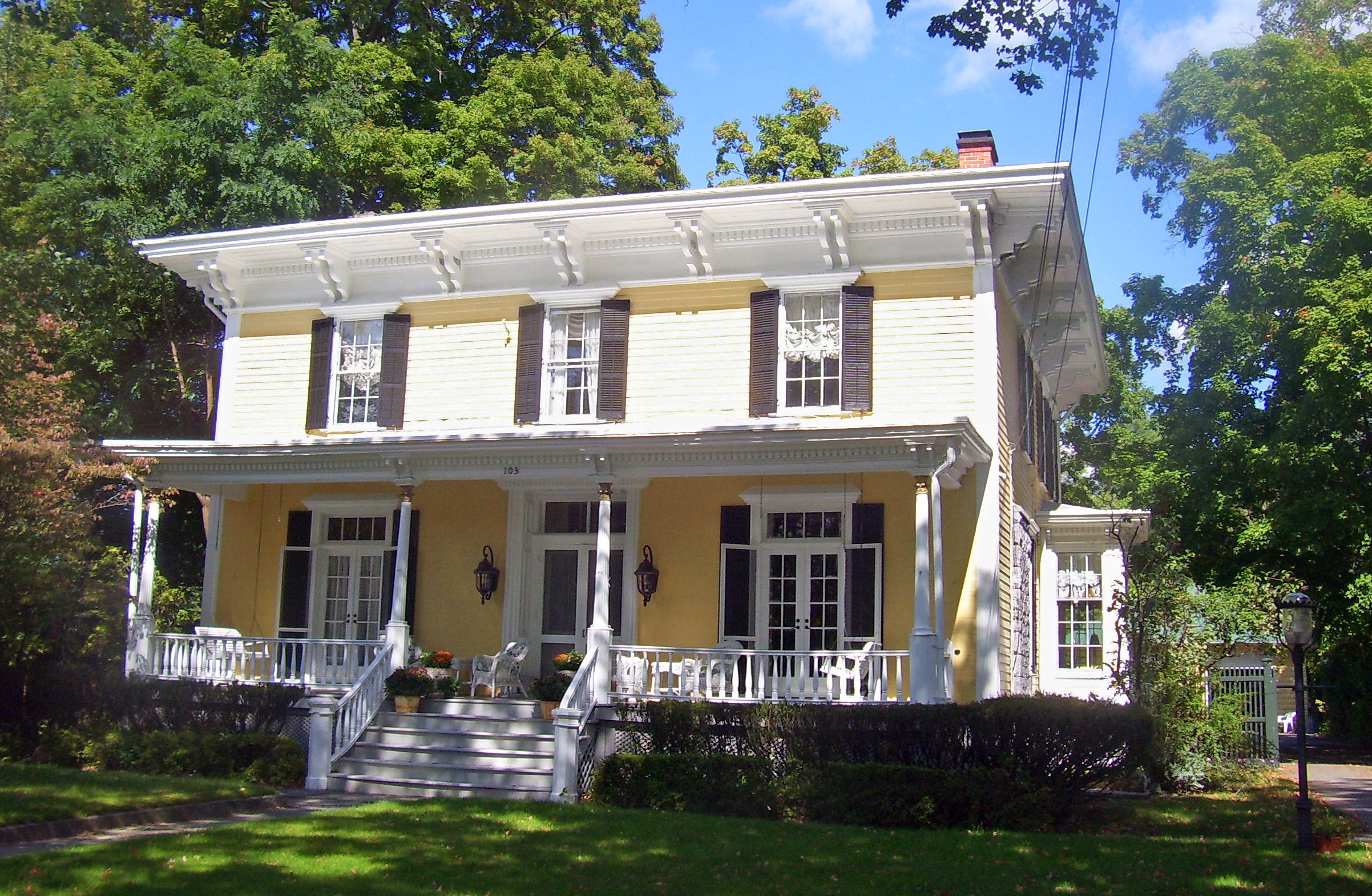
- South elevation and east profile, 2008

- Location within New York Location within the United States
- Location: Kingston, New York
- Coordinates: 41°55′58″N 74°0′39″W
- Area: less than one acre
- Built: ca. 1860
- Architectural style: Italianate
- MPS: Albany Avenue, Kingston, Ulster County, New York MPS
- NRHP reference No.: 02001315
- Added to NRHP: November 15, 2002

The John Smith House is located on Albany Avenue (NY 32) in Kingston, New York, United States. It is a wood-frame house in the Italianate architectural style built in the mid-19th century.

It has remained relatively intact since then. In 2002 it was listed on the National Register of Historic Places.

== Building ==
The house is on a deep, narrow, level lot at the corner of the busy intersection of Albany Avenue and Chandler Drive (Interstate 587/NY 28). This junction marks a boundary between the mixed-use uptown area around the Stockade District and the residential neighborhoods of Albany and neighboring streets. The George J. Smith House is to the east, with the Sharp Burial Ground about 300 feet (91 m) further away on the other side of the street. Both properties are also listed on the Register.

The Smith house is a two-story, three-by-three-bay clapboard-sided frame structure on a raised brick foundation with a moderately pitched hipped roof. The roofline has broad overhanging eaves, a molded cornice and paired brackets.

A full-length porch runs along the first story of the south (front) facade. It has a similarly pitched hip roof with a molded, dentilled cornice. The roof is supported by four wooden posts on octagonal plinths. Behind all three bays have French doors, molded cornices and louvered shutters. The second-story windows have similar trim.

On the northernmost two bays of the first story on the east is a projecting bay window. The north (rear) elevation has similar windows and an enclosed porch. The west, facing what is now the end of the interstate, is the least decorated of the facades, with asymmetrical windows and an enclosed cellar stair.

The main entrance, two paneled glass and wood doors with a large transom, leads to a broad central hall with large parlors on either side. Here and on the second floor, many of the original finishings, including plaster and wood, remain.

At the end of the driveway to the east is a modern garage in concrete block. It is not considered a contributing resource to the historic character of the property.

== History ==
The house is first recorded in an 1870 map as the home of a Mrs. C.S. Smith. A city directory from ten years later clarifies that this is Catherine S. Smith, described as the widow of John Smith. By the early 20th century it had passed to other owners, and has remained a private residence ever since.

Originally the house had a cupola in the center of the roof. It was removed in the early 20th century after it was damaged. There have been no significant changes since.

== See also ==
- National Register of Historic Places listings in Ulster County, New York
