= George J. Smith House =

Historic house in New York, United States

- U.S. National Register of Historic Places
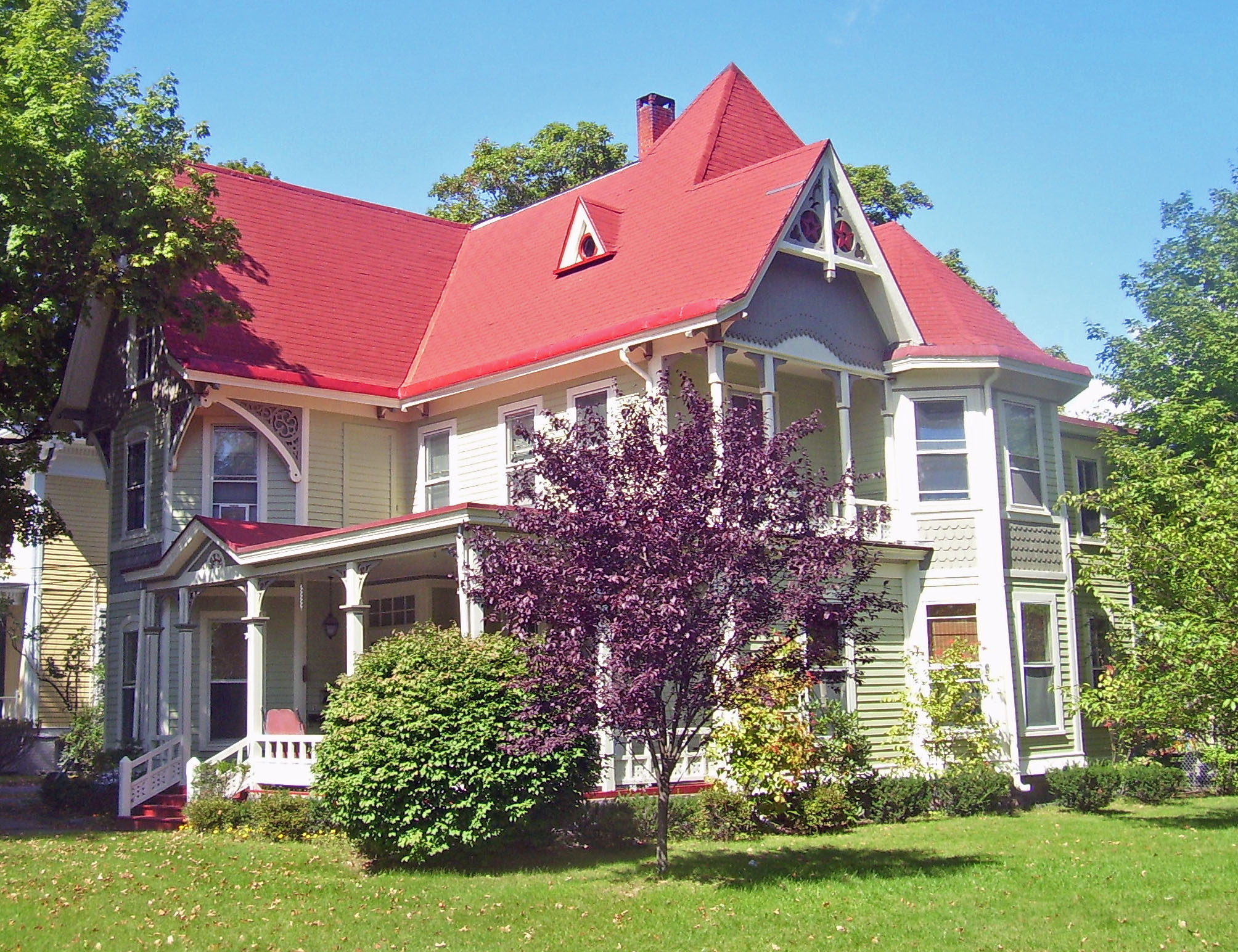
- South elevation and east profile, 2008

- Location within New York Location within the United States
- Location: Kingston, New York
- Coordinates: 41°55′58″N 74°0′38″W
- Area: 1.03 acres (4,200 m^{2})
- Built: 1885
- Architectural style: Queen Anne
- MPS: Albany Avenue, Kingston, Ulster County, New York MPS
- NRHP reference No.: 02001316
- Added to NRHP: November 15, 2002

The George J. Smith House is located on Albany Avenue (NY 32) in Kingston, New York, United States. It is a Queen Anne Style frame house built in the 1880s. Its interior has been slightly modified since then.

In addition to being a representative example of the Queen Anne Style in Kingston, it was home to George J. Smith, who served a term as the area's congressman. In 2002 it was listed on the National Register of Historic Places. Currently its lower floor is a local Montessori school, and the upper floor is an apartment.

== Property ==
The George J. Smith House is situated on a 100 by 450 feet (30 by 137 m) lot on the north side of a divided section of Albany Avenue, a short distance east of its junction with Interstate 587 and NY 28. The neighborhood is residential, with most houses of similar vintage. The John Smith House next door to the west is also listed on the Register, as is the Sharp Burial Ground across Albany a short distance to the east. Another house is to the east with a woodlot to the north.

The house itself is a three-story building on a brick foundation sided in a mix of cedar clapboard and wood shingle. It has steeply pitched multiple intersecting gable roofs and projecting bays covered in red shingles.

On the south (front) facade, a three-story three-sided bay projects from the southwest corner. It has alternating bands of siding, projecting eaves with gable stickwork. To its east a porch extends across the rest of the first story. It has a gable roof offset to the east, supported by four chamfered posts with decorative capitals in pierced woodwork trim.

The east profile has an inset porch on the second story near the front. It has similar decorative stickwork below its projecting gable. Next to it is another projection, a two-story three-sided bay topped with a hipped roof. The north has a two-story wing and two-story porch. On the west, the simplest side, is a large exterior brick chimney.

The main entrance is a pair of wooden and glass doors in a heavily molded frame. It leads to a broad central hall flanked on the west by two parlors joined by a broad archway. Both have fireplaces with intricate classically inspired wooden mantels. Many of the finishes, including the lath and plaster walls and carved architraves, are original. On the east of the main hall a stairway climbs to the second floor. It has finely carved balusters and newels. The second floor has been converted into an apartment but retains many original finishes as well.

At the northwest corner of the property is a small garage. It appears to have been a carriage house built at the same time as the house, and is thus considered a contributing resource to the property's historic character.

== History ==
The house first appears on a fire insurance map in 1887. Five years later, in 1892, a city directory identifies the owner as George J. Smith.

Smith had brought the Powell Cigar Company to the city, built a large factory and made it the Powell, Smith & Company. Later it became the American Cigar Company, with 1,800 employees at its peak. In the years after the house was built, he became active in Republican politics, serving as the county committee chair and the state treasurer in the late 1890s. Four years after that, in 1902, he was elected to the House for a single term.

The house remained a private residence until its use by the school. It has had no other modifications save those made for that use.

== See also ==
- National Register of Historic Places listings in Ulster County, New York
