= House at 184 Albany Avenue =

Historic house in New York, United States

- U.S. National Register of Historic Places
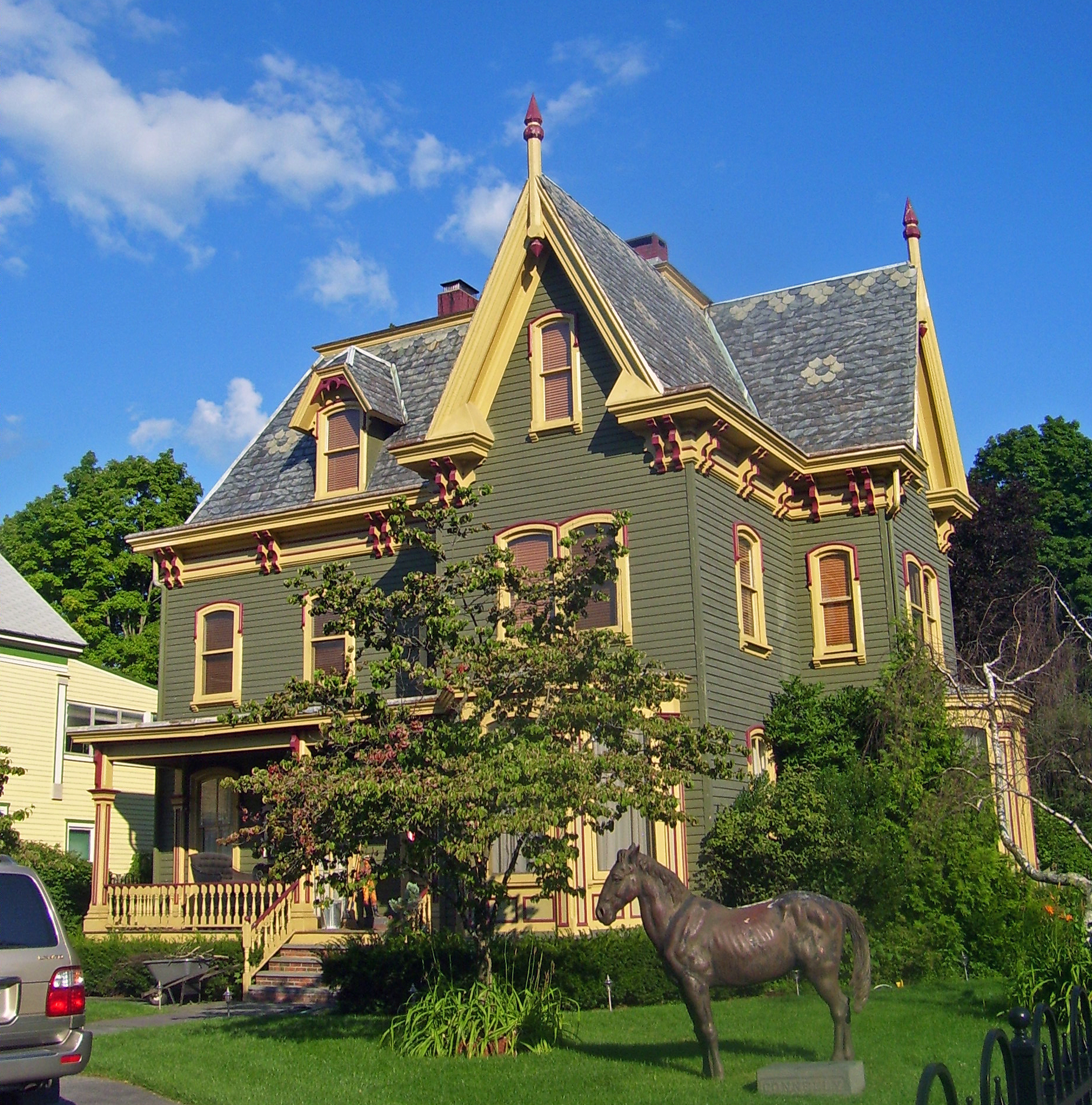
- West elevation and south profile, 2008
- Location: Kingston, New York
- Coordinates: 41°56′1″N 74°0′27″W
- Area: 21,600 square feet (2,010 m^{2})
- Built: ca. 1860
- Architectural style: Picturesque
- MPS: Historic and Architectural Resources of Albany Avenue, Kingston, Ulster County, New York
- NRHP reference No.: 02001317
- Added to NRHP: 2002

The house at 184 Albany Avenue (NY 32) in Kingston, New York, United States, is a frame building in the Picturesque mode of the Gothic Revival architectural style. It was built around 1860.

In 2002 it was listed on the National Register of Historic Places. It has remained a private residence since its original construction.

== Building ==
The house sits on a long, narrow (80 by 270 feet (24 by 82 m)) lot on the east side of the street, a short distance north of the Kingston Stockade District and three houses south of Tremper Avenue. The neighborhood is exclusively residential, except for the nearby Sharp Burial Ground. A non-contributing pool and outbuilding are located behind the house.

It is a two-and-a-half-story building on a brick foundation. The clapboard siding rises to a steeply pitched mansard roof with two cross-gables. It is shingled in patterned slate. The rooflines are marked by heavily molded cornices, paired brackets and decorative friezes. The gables are topped with finials.

On the southwest corner of the west (front) facade is a one-and-a-half-story projecting bay. At the first story this features a bay window. A porch stretches across the rest of the facade at that story. Its roof is supported by three chamfered and paneled posts with brackets. The main entrance has leaded sidelights and an arched top light.

A similar bay, two and a half stories high, projects from the south side. It too has a bay window at ground level. A single-story rear wing projects from the east, adjacent to an enclosed porch now part of an expanded kitchen. The north profile has no projections or additions.

Inside, the house has a double-pile central hall plan. The first story retains much of its original finishing, such as carved newels and balusters on the stairs, molded door and window surrounds and decorated plaster cornices and ceilings. The second story also has its original plan and finishings; the attic has been renovated, opening up the space once used as servants' quarters. It still has some of the original finishing.

== History ==
The house is believed to have been built around 1860, probably following patterns in books by Andrew Jackson Downing, who had strongly promoted the Picturesque mode as an ideal for American residential construction during his lifetime. Few significant owners are known. In 1909 the city directory gives the owner as Charles Banker, a local osteopathic physician. In 1921 it was the property of Vincent Gorman and his wife, Margaret. Gorman was a founding partner of the city's Rose Gorman Rose department store. In 1965 the house was purchased by George and Bianca Vogel. Their family, which included 4 children, lived in the house for about 20 years.

== See also ==
- National Register of Historic Places listings in Ulster County, New York
