= Sharp Burial Ground =

Historic cemetery in New York, United States

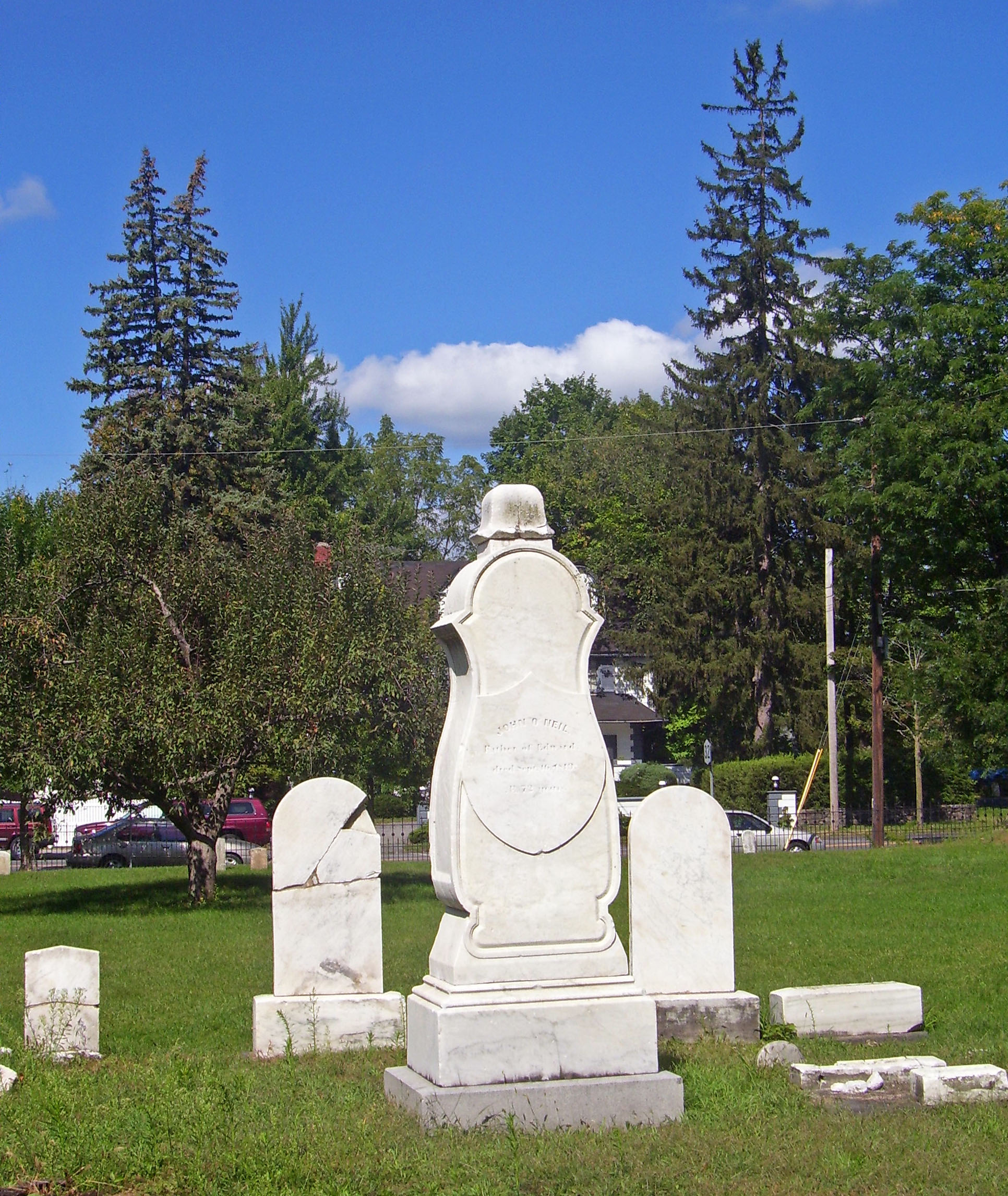
- John O'Neil monument and surrounding headstones
- Interactive map of Sharp Burial Ground

Details
- Established: 1832
- Location: Albany Ave., Kingston, New York
- Country: US
- Coordinates: 41°56′18″N 74°0′11″W
- Type: Public
- Owned by: City of Kingston
- Size: 1.6 acres (0.6 ha)
- No. of graves: 186
- Find a Grave: Sharp Burial Ground
- The Political Graveyard: Sharp Burial Ground
- Sharp Burial Ground
- U.S. National Register of Historic Places
- MPS: Albany Avenue, Kingston, Ulster County, New York MPS
- NRHP reference No.: 02001320
- Added to NRHP: November 15, 2002

The Sharp Burial Ground, also known as the Albany Avenue Cemetery, is located on Albany Avenue (NY 32) in Kingston, New York, United States. It is a small burying ground used during the middle decades of the 19th century, before larger rural cemeteries had become common but after churchyards had become too full for further burials. Later, when they did open, many bodies were removed to consolidate them with larger family plots there. Two former congressmen are still among those buried at Sharp.

It contains some interesting examples of funerary art from that period, particularly the large monument to its founder, Edward O'Neil. It fell into neglect and disrepair throughout much of the 20th century, but was cleaned and restored by a local historic preservation group in the 1990s. In 2002 it was listed on the National Register of Historic Places as part of the Historic and Architectural Resources of Albany Avenue, Kingston, Ulster County, multiple property submission (MPS). It is the only cemetery in Ulster County listed on the Register in its own right.

== Property ==
The cemetery is located on the east side of Albany where it turns to the northeast just 400 feet (120 m) east of its junction with Interstate 587 and NY 28, one of the main western entrances to the city. It is a rectangular 1.6-acre (6,500 m^{2}) parcel bounded on the south by a former railroad right-of-way that curves slightly to the southwest. On the north and east its boundaries are the property lines of homes on Albany and Elmendorf streets respectively.

Its neighborhood is residential, with most houses dating to the late 19th century. Four other houses in the neighborhood, those of John Smith, George J. Smith and Jacob Ten Broeck, as well as 184 Albany Avenue, are listed on the National Register as well.

An iron fence, with gate in the middle, runs along the sidewalk. It is of modern construction and thus not considered a contributing resource to the cemetery's historic character. The cemetery plot is level, with a few mature trees and plantings. The gravestones are located in irregular groupings, with no trace of any grid or plan evident. Two large monuments stand out: a tall vase-shaped marker for Edward O'Neil, and an obelisk for Abraham Hasbrouck, a former state legislator and U.S. congressman.

== History ==
Records and markers suggest that part of the land was in use as a cemetery as early as 1810. Its formal use for that purpose dates to 1832, when Edward O'Neil surveyed it and made a plan for 210 graves. The lots grew larger from the rear to the front, where subdivisions of 330 square feet (30.7 m^{2}) had been reserved for the major religious denominations in town.

The Sharp cemetery is typical of a post-settlement era. Churchyards dating to colonial times had begun to fill up, and with the village rapidly growing a rural cemetery would have set aside too much land. Burying grounds, usually on the outskirts of communities, were large enough and rationally planned to handle the extra graves for the foreseeable future.

Some of the graves exemplify the funerary art trends of mid-19th century American Protestantism. O'Neil's own grave, from 1856, is in a vase shape with carved laurel wreath, representing his memory. The willow and urn, representing sadness and the soul of the deceased respectively, are also found on a number of graves from this period.

The last burials took place in the 1870s. By then the larger Montrepose and Wiltwyck rural cemeteries had opened further from what was by then the city, and many families had relatives who had been buried in Sharp moved to family plots in those graveyards. A decade later, Nathaniel Bartlett Sylvester wrote in his history of the county that the old Sharp Burial Ground was "very handsome", but appeared to be getting neglected because of all the moved graves.

That decline continued until 1995, when Friends of Historic Kingston (FOHK), a local group devoted to preserving the city's historic buildings, structures and sites, cleaned it up and restored the surviving stones. At this time the fence and gate were also added. FOHK continues to maintain the cemetery.

== Notable interments ==
- Abraham J. Hasbrouck (1773–1845), state assemblyman and congressman.
- Jacob H. DeWitt (1784–1867), assemblyman, congressman and a member of the county board of supervisors.
- John Van Buren (1799–1855), U.S. Congressman, Member of the New York State Assembly, Ulster County Judge.
- John Sudam (1782–1835), state senator

== See also ==
- National Register of Historic Places listings in Ulster County, New York
