= George J. Smith =

American politician

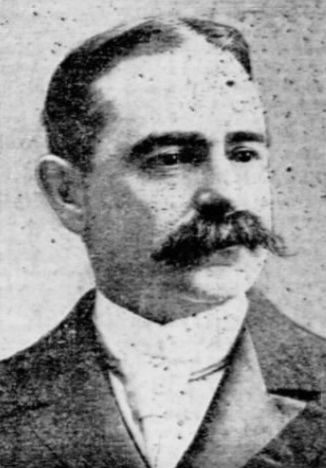
- New-York Daily Tribune, August 4, 1902

Member of the U.S. House of Representatives from New York's 24th district
- In office March 4, 1903 – March 3, 1905
- Preceded by: Charles L. Knapp
- Succeeded by: Frank J. LeFevre

Personal details
- Born: November 7, 1859 Kingston, New York, U.S.
- Died: December 24, 1913 (aged 54) Atlantic City, New Jersey, U.S.
- Resting place: Wiltwyck Cemetery, Kingston, New York
- Party: Republican

George Joseph Smith (November 7, 1859 – December 24, 1913) was a U.S. representative from New York.

== Early life and career ==
Smith was born in Kingston, New York, to parents George J. Smith and Harriet M. (Ryder) Smith. He was educated in the local public schools, including Kingston Academy.

As a businessperson, Smith was primarily involved in the cigar manufacturing business in both New York City and Kingston. He founded a cigar factory in Kingston that produced Cremo-brand cigars, later selling his factory to the American Cigar Company, of which he became president. He was a partner in the firm Powell, Weinigmann & Smith (later Powell, Smith & Co.) in Manhattan and was at the time of his death a vice president of Acker, Merrall & Condit Co., also in Manhattan. His career in cigar manufacturing was a lucrative one, with him being described as having "accumulated a fortune" through it.

Smith was also involved with banking, real estate (particularly the development of Long Island), and the wholesale grocery business.

== Politics ==
Smith served as chairman of the Republican county committee in 1898 and was treasurer of the Republican State committee in 1899. He served as delegate to the Republican National Convention in 1909.

He was elected as a Republican to the Fifty-eighth Congress (March 4, 1903 – March 3, 1905) but declined to be a candidate for reelection, after which he was not involved in politics except for another term as state party treasurer in 1909.

== Personal life ==
Smith was a Presbyterian who married Laura N. Lynch in their hometown of Kingston. He was a trustee of the School for Crippled Children and the Kingston YMCA, as well as a member of the Union League, the New York Yacht Club, and the New York Athletic Club.

In August 1913, Smith experienced what was called a "nervous collapse," after which he relocated to Atlantic City, New Jersey to be cared for by a private doctor and nurse. He suffered a heart attack and died there on December 24, 1913. He was interred in Wiltwyck Cemetery, Kingston, New York.

His Kingston home, the George J. Smith House, is on the National Register of Historic Places.

== Sources ==
- United States Congress. "George J. Smith (id: S000538)". Biographical Directory of the United States Congress.

U.S. House of Representatives
Preceded by Charles L. Knapp	Member of the U.S. House of Representatives from New York's 24th congressional district March 4, 1903 – March 3, 1905	Succeeded by Frank J. LeFevre
