= Abraham J. Hasbrouck =

American politician

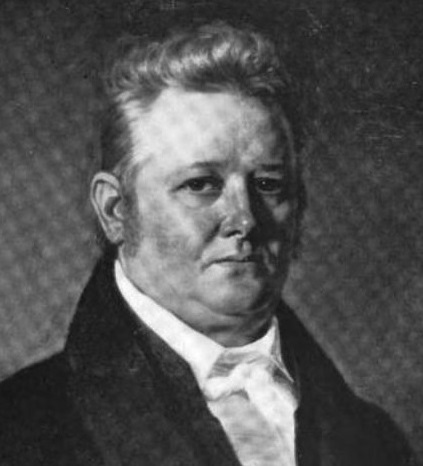
Abraham J. Hasbrouck

Abraham Joseph Hasbrouck (October 16, 1773 – January 12, 1845) was a United States representative from New York and a slaveholder.

== Biography ==
Hasbrouck was born in Guilford (now Libertyville in Gardiner), Ulster County, New York. He was privately tutored and moved to Kingston in 1795, engaging in mercantile pursuits.

He was one of the incorporators of the Delaware & Hudson Canal and was appointed a first lieutenant of Cavalry in the New York Militia.

He was an organizer and director of the Middle District Bank of Kingston and served in the New York State Assembly in 1811. Hasbrouck was elected as a Democratic-Republican to the Thirteenth Congress, holding office from March 4, 1813, to March 3, 1815; he was not a candidate for renomination in 1814.

He engaged in freighting goods to New York City by water. He was a member of the New York State Senate in 1822.

He died in Kingston in 1845 and was buried at the Albany Avenue Cemetery.

Hasbrouck's cousin, Abraham Bruyn Hasbrouck, was also a U.S. Representative from New York.

Both Abraham Joseph Hasbrouck and Abraham Bruyn Hasbrouck are descendants of the Hasbroucks who founded New Paltz in 1678. The Hasbroucks were Huguenots, Protestant followers of John Calvin who fled what is today Northern France and South Belgium who fled persecution by the ruling Catholics. The original settlement of their ancestors survives today as Historic Huguenot Street, a National Historic Landmark District.

Hasbrouck was the great-grandfather of Major General Henry Granville Sharpe and Robert W. Hasbrouck.

== Sources ==
- United States Congress. "Abraham J. Hasbrouck (id: H000313)". Biographical Directory of the United States Congress.

U.S. House of Representatives
Preceded by Harmanus Bleecker	Member of the U.S. House of Representatives from New York's 7th congressional district 1813–1815	Succeeded by Samuel Betts
