= Frank J. LeFevre =

American politician

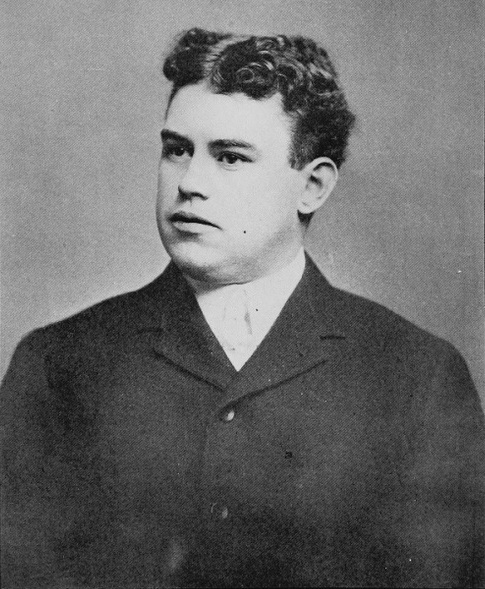

Member of the U.S. House of Representatives from New York's 19th district
- In office March 4, 1905 – March 3, 1907
- Preceded by: George J. Smith
- Succeeded by: George W. Fairchild

Member of the New York State Senate
- In office 1903–1904

Personal details
- Born: Frank Jacob Le Fevre; November 30, 1874 New Paltz, New York, U.S.
- Died: April 29, 1941 (aged 66) Atlantic City, New Jersey, U.S.
- Resting place: Moravian Cemetery, Staten Island, New York, U.S.
- Party: Republican
- Relatives: Jay Le Fevre (relative)
- Education: New Paltz Normal School
- Occupation: Banker, politician
- Known for: President of the Huguenot National Bank

Frank Jacob Le Fevre (November 30, 1874 – April 29, 1941) was a U.S. representative from New York, son of Jacob Le Fever.

== Early life and education ==
Born in New Paltz, New York, LeFevre was a descendant of the city's founders. Le Fevre attended the public schools and the New Paltz Normal School, later named State University of New York at New Paltz. While at the Normal School, he became a member of Alpha Pi Nu, which was later known as the Delphic Fraternity.

== Career ==
Le Fevre became engaged in banking and later served as member of the State Senate in 1903 and 1904. He was appointed superintendent of the New York State building at St. Louis, Missouri, during the Louisiana Purchase Exposition.

Le Fevre was elected as a Republican to the Fifty-ninth Congress and served from March 1905 to March 1907. He was not renominated in 1906. He also became president of the Huguenot National Bank at New Paltz, New York, in 1905. He engaged in banking and fruit growing.

== Death ==
He died in Atlantic City, New Jersey, April 29, 1941. He was interred in Moravian Cemetery, Richmond, Staten Island, New York.

== Sources ==
- United States Congress. "Frank J. LeFevre (id: L000160)". Biographical Directory of the United States Congress.

New York State Senate
Preceded by William S. C. Wiley	New York State Senate; 25th District; 1903-1904	Succeeded by John N. Cordts
U.S. House of Representatives
Preceded by George J. Smith	Member of the U.S. House of Representatives from New York's 24th congressional district March 4, 1905 – March 3, 1907	Succeeded by George W. Fairchild
