= Thermoplastic olefin =

Plastic polymer/filler blend

Thermoplastic olefin, thermoplastic polyolefin (TPO), or olefinic thermoplastic elastomers refer to polymer/filler blends usually consisting of some fraction of a thermoplastic, an elastomer or rubber, and usually a filler.

Outdoor applications such as roofing frequently contain TPO because it does not degrade under solar UV radiation, a common problem with nylons. TPO is used extensively in the automotive industry.

== Materials ==
=== Thermoplastics ===
Thermoplastics may include polypropylene (PP), polyethylene (PE), block copolymer polypropylene (BCPP), and others.

=== Fillers ===
Common fillers include, though are not restricted to, talc, fiberglass, carbon fiber, wollastonite, and MOS (Metal Oxy Sulfate).

=== Elastomers ===
Common elastomers include ethylene propylene rubber (EPR), EPDM (EP-diene rubber), ethylene-octene (EO), ethylbenzene (EB), and styrene ethylene butadiene styrene (SEBS). Currently there are a great variety of commercially available rubbers and BCPP's. They are produced using regioselective and stereoselective catalysts known as metallocenes. The metallocene catalyst becomes embedded in the polymer and cannot be recovered.

== Creation ==
Components for TPO are blended together at 210 - 270 °C under high shear. A twin screw extruder or a continuous mixer may be employed to achieve a continuous stream, or a Banbury compounder may be employed for batch production. A higher degree of mixing and dispersion is achieved in the batch process, but the superheat batch must immediately be processed through an extruder to be pelletized into a transportable intermediate. Thus batch production essentially adds an additional cost step.

== Structure ==
The geometry of the metallocene catalyst will determine the sequence of chirality in the chain, as in, atactic, syndiotactic, isotactic, as well as average block length, molecular weight and distribution. These characteristics will in turn govern the microstructure of the blend.

As in metal alloys the properties of a TPO product depend greatly upon controlling the size and distribution of the microstructure. PP and PE form lamellar crystallites separated by amorphous regions that can grow into a variety of microstructures ranging from single crystals from dilute solution crystallization to fiberous crystals and shish-kabob structures. Thin films from quiescent melts can form spherulitic impinging structures that display cylindrically symmetric birefringence. The PP and PE components of a blend constitute the "crystalline phase", and the rubber and branched PE chains and PE/PP end groups gives the "amorphous phase".

If PP and PE are the dominant component of a TPO blend then the rubber fraction will be dispersed into a continuous matrix of "crystalline" polypropylene. If the fraction of rubber is greater than 40% phase inversion may be possible when the blend cools, resulting in an amorphous continuous phase, and a crystalline dispersed phase. This type of material is non-rigid, and is sometimes called TPR for ThermoPlastic Rubber.

To increase the rigidity of a TPO blend, fillers exploit a surface tension phenomena. By selecting a filler with a higher surface area per weight, a higher flexural modulus can be achieved. Specific density of TPO blends range from 0.92 to 1.1.

== Application ==
TPO is easily processed by injection molding, profile extrusion, and thermoforming. However, TPO cannot be blown, or sustain a film thickness less than 1/4 mil (about 6 micrometers).
