= Roof pitch =

Measure of roof steepness

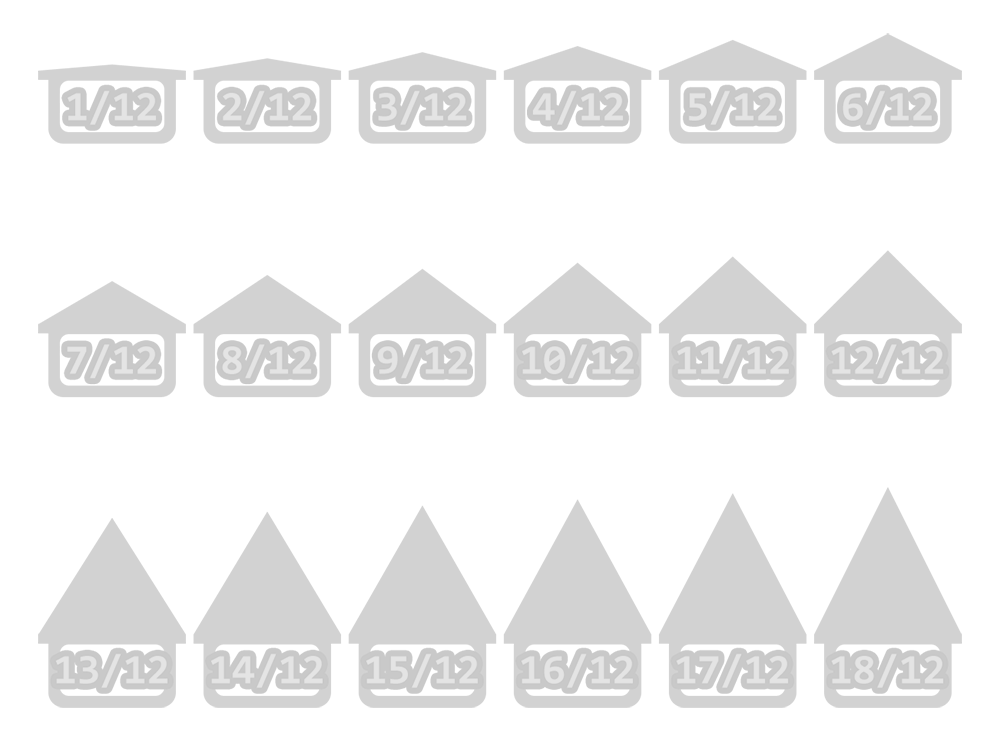
Display of roof pitches 1:12 through 18:12

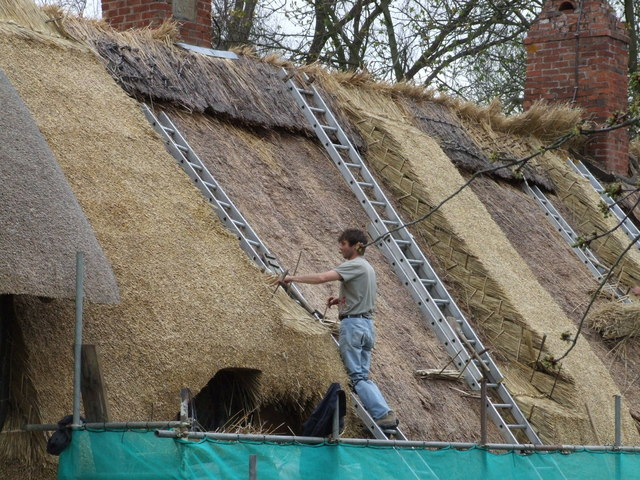
A roof made of thatch, one of the oldest roofing materials, needs a steep pitch to drain properly

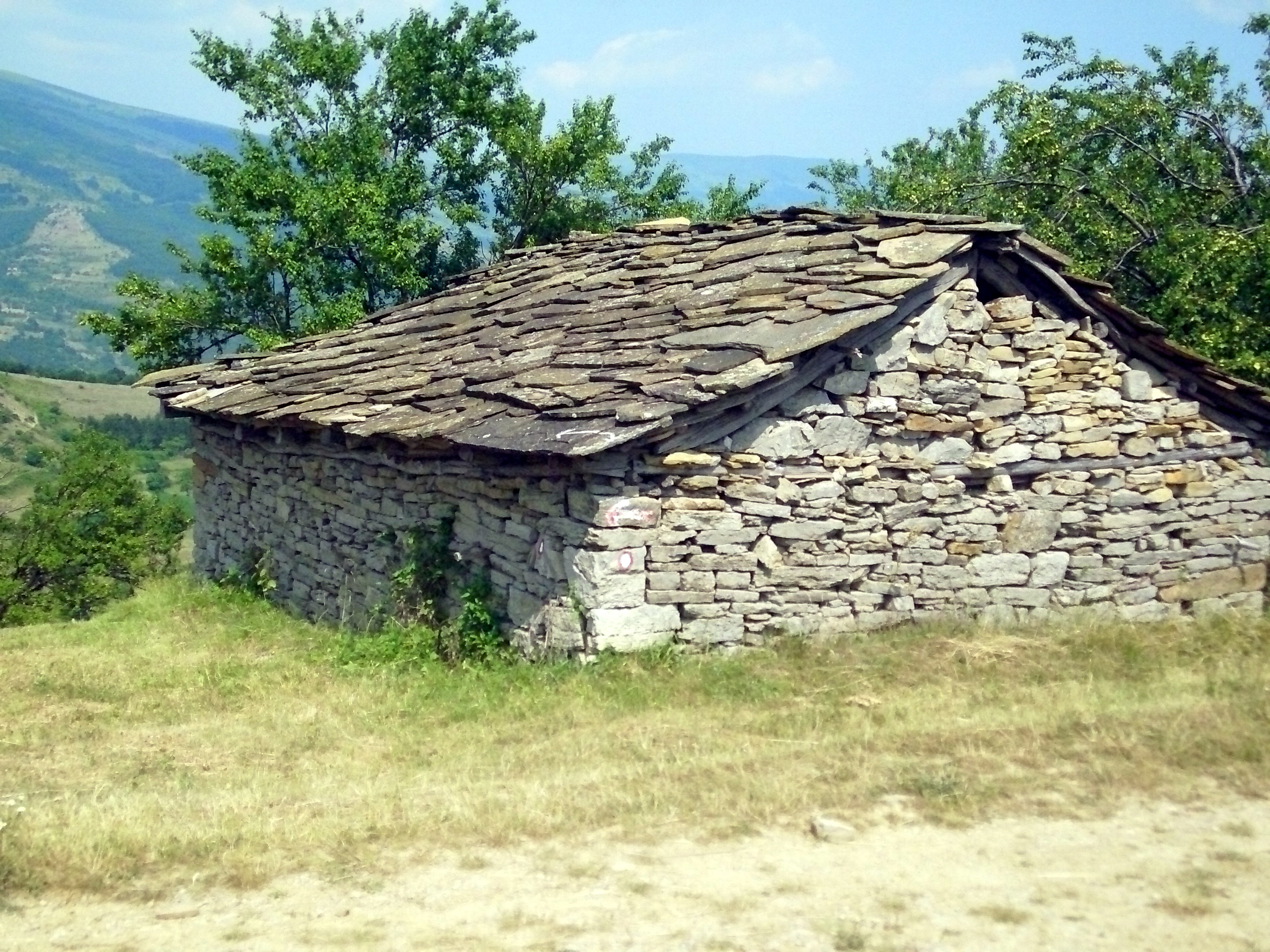
Some types of stone roof have a very restrictive roof pitch, which can lead to leaking

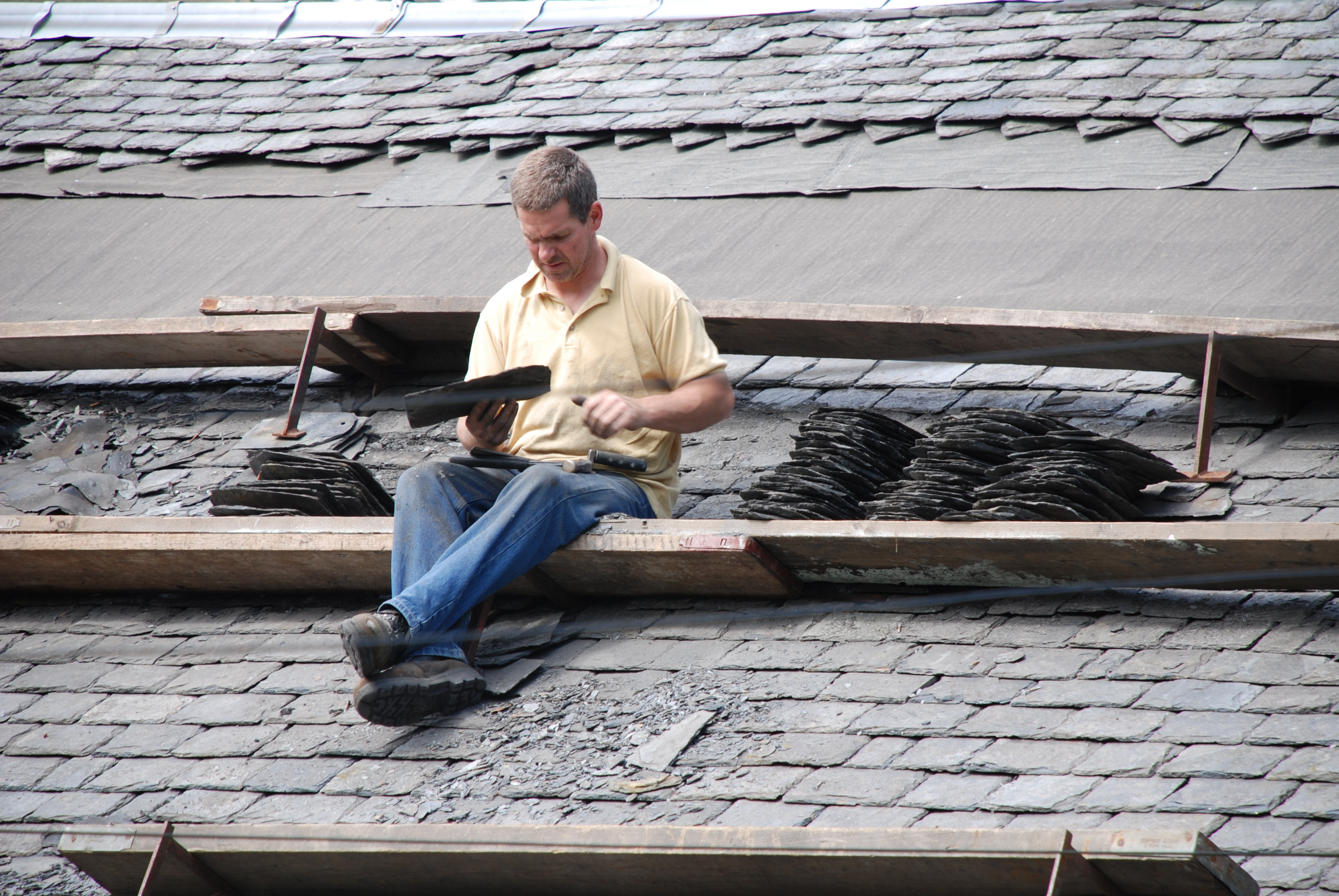
Working on roofs with pitches too steep for safety requires a staging of scaffolding boards secured with roof brackets

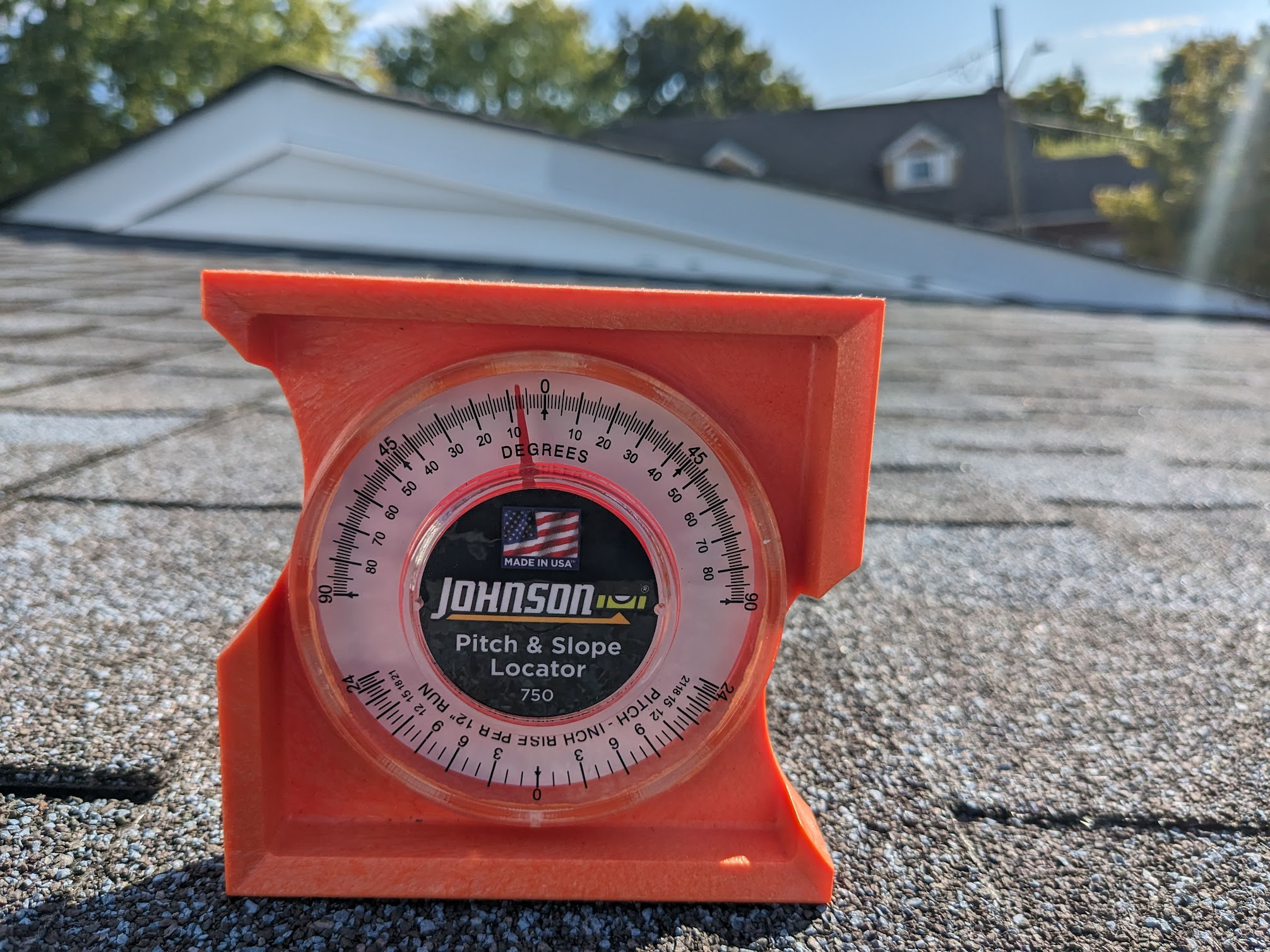
A pitch gauge measuring the slope of an asphalt shingle roof

Roof pitch is the steepness of a roof expressed as a ratio of inch(es) rise per horizontal foot (or their metric equivalent), or as the angle in degrees its surface deviates from the horizontal. A flat roof has a pitch of zero in either instance; all other roofs are pitched.

== Description ==
The pitch of a roof is expressed as a fraction, with the vertical rise from the top of the wall plates to the ridge as the numerator, and the horizontal span between the wall plates as the denominator. Regardless of the units used, the fraction is simplified to its lowest terms and understood as a ratio.

While the terms pitch and slope are sometimes used interchangeably, they refer to distinct concepts in roof geometry. Pitch is defined as the ratio of the total vertical rise to the total horizontal span of a roof, whereas slope is defined as the ratio of the rise to the run (half the span), typically standardized to a fixed unit such as 12 inches in imperial units or 1 meter in the metric system. For example, a roof that rises 6 inches for every 12 inches of horizontal run has a slope of 6:12.

A common misconception is that the pitch of a roof is what is displayed on a framing square. In fact, the tables and markings on a framing square represent slope, not pitch. These values are based on a standard run of 12 inches (or 1 meter in metric systems) and provide rise-per-unit-run information, which is essential for calculating rafter lengths, plumb cuts, and other framing details. The framing square does not indicate pitch, even though it is sometimes mistakenly described that way.

To convert pitch to slope in imperial units, the pitch is multiplied by 24, yielding the equivalent slope in rise per 12 inches of run. For example, a pitch of 1/6 corresponds to a slope of 4:12 (1/6 x 24 = 4).

In the metric system, where slope is expressed as rise per meter of run, the pitch is multiplied by 2 to obtain the rise over a 1-meter run. For instance, a pitch of 1/6 would result in a slope of approximately 333 mm per meter (1/6 x 2 = 333mm).

== Selection ==
Considerations involved in selecting a roof pitch include availability and cost of materials, aesthetics, ease or difficulty of construction, climatic factors such as wind and potential snow load, and local building codes.

Pitches require different applications. In Canada, the NBC lays out requirements to allow for ranges of roof slopes.

The NBC defines a low slope as less than 1 in 3 (4/12), while normal slopes are 1 in 3 (4/12) or greater. For each slope category, there are specific codes that must be followed. These codes also contain equations with variables that need to be replaced with values from a 774-row, 16-column table. Each entry in the table corresponds to a geographical location within Canada and provides location-specific weather averages and 1-in-50-year extremes (such as rain, snow, and wind), as well as values to prevent and control fire spread, moisture index, and degree days below 18°C (which are important for concrete applications). These values must then be substituted into the relevant variables of the equations in the building code, ensuring the structure is built to withstand local environmental conditions and last over time.

Carpenters framing roofs for buildings or homes typically round their calculations to three decimal places. The smallest fraction of an inch used in framing is a 16th (0.0625"), which is rounded to 0.063". The mathematical operations involved in framing equations are minimal, so rounding to three decimal places results in a solution that is accurate within a 1/16th of an inch.

== Historic expressions of roof pitch ==
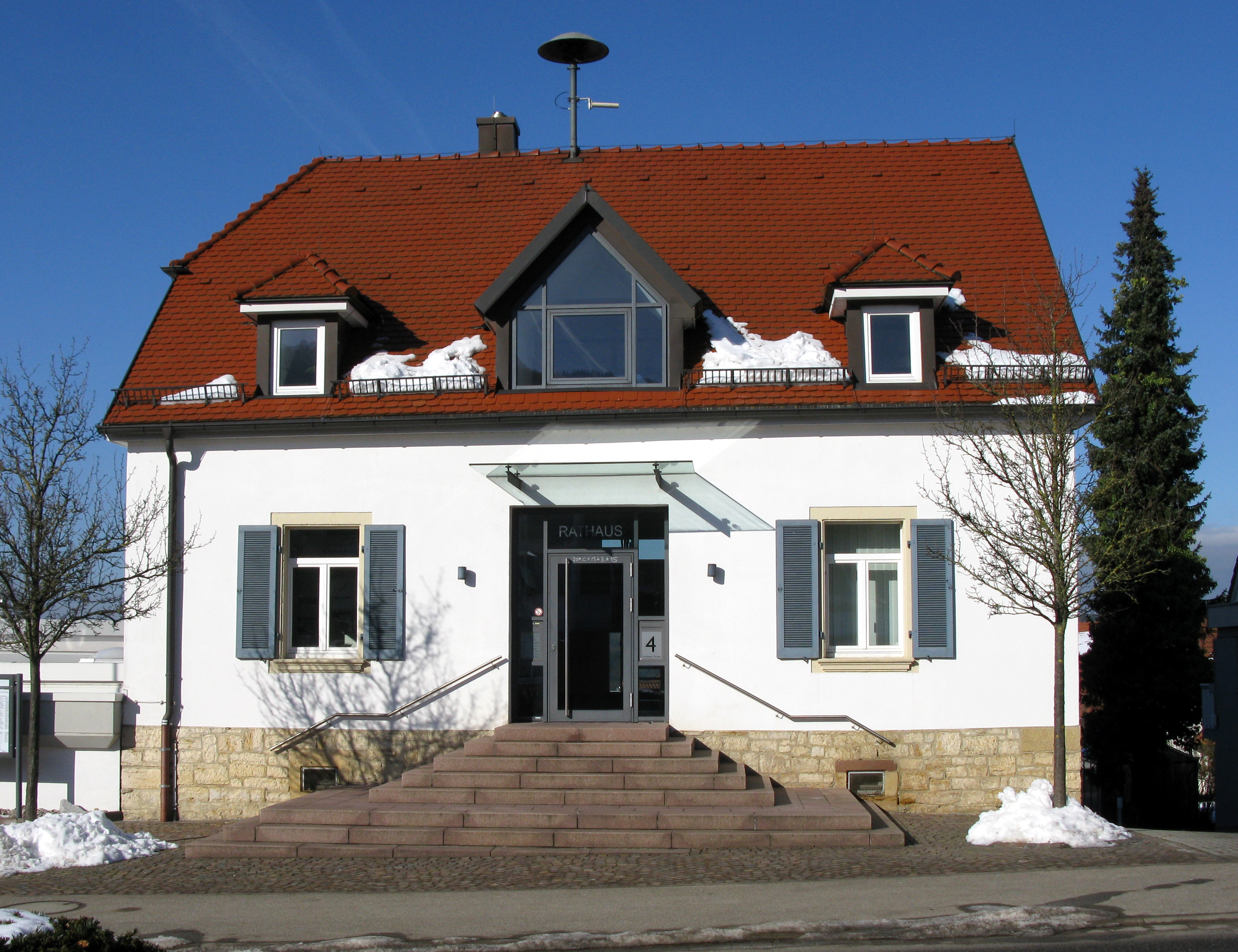
A building in the Black Forest of Germany with a pitched roof

Historically, roof pitch was designated in two other ways: A ratio of the ridge height to the width of the building (span) and as a ratio of the rafter length to the width of the building.

Commonly used roof pitches were given names such as:

- Greek: the ridge height is 1/9 to 1/7 the span (an angle of 12.5° to 16°);
- Roman: the ridge height is 2/9 to 1/3 the span (an angle of 24° to 34°);
- Common: the rafter length is 3/4 the span (about 48°);
- Gothic: the rafters equal the span (60°); and
- Elizabethan: the rafters are longer than the span (more than 60°).

== See also ==
- List of roof shapes
- Shed roof
- Flat roof
