= Exterior cleaning =

Cleaning of a building's exterior surfaces

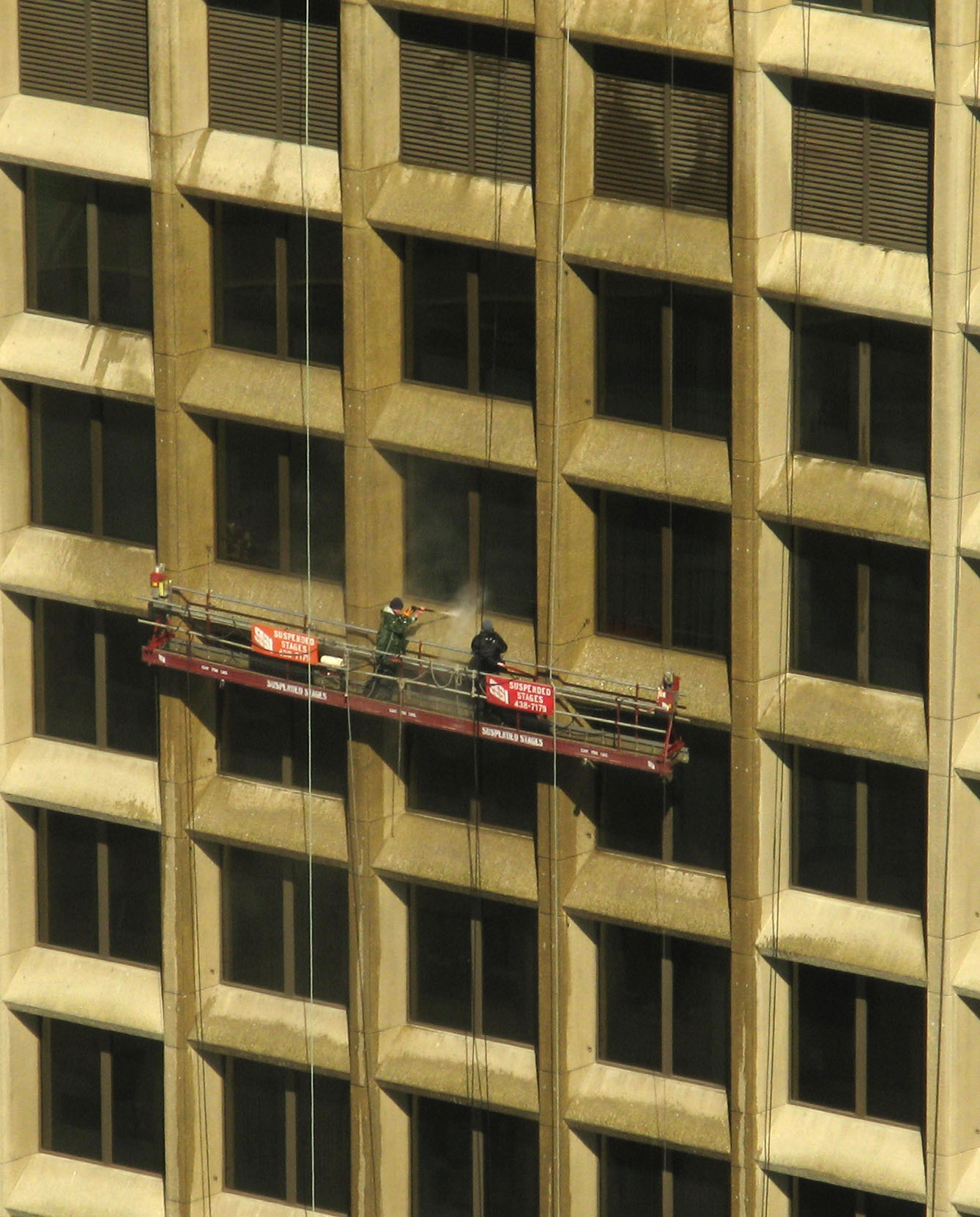
Cleaning a skyscraper on a suspended stage.

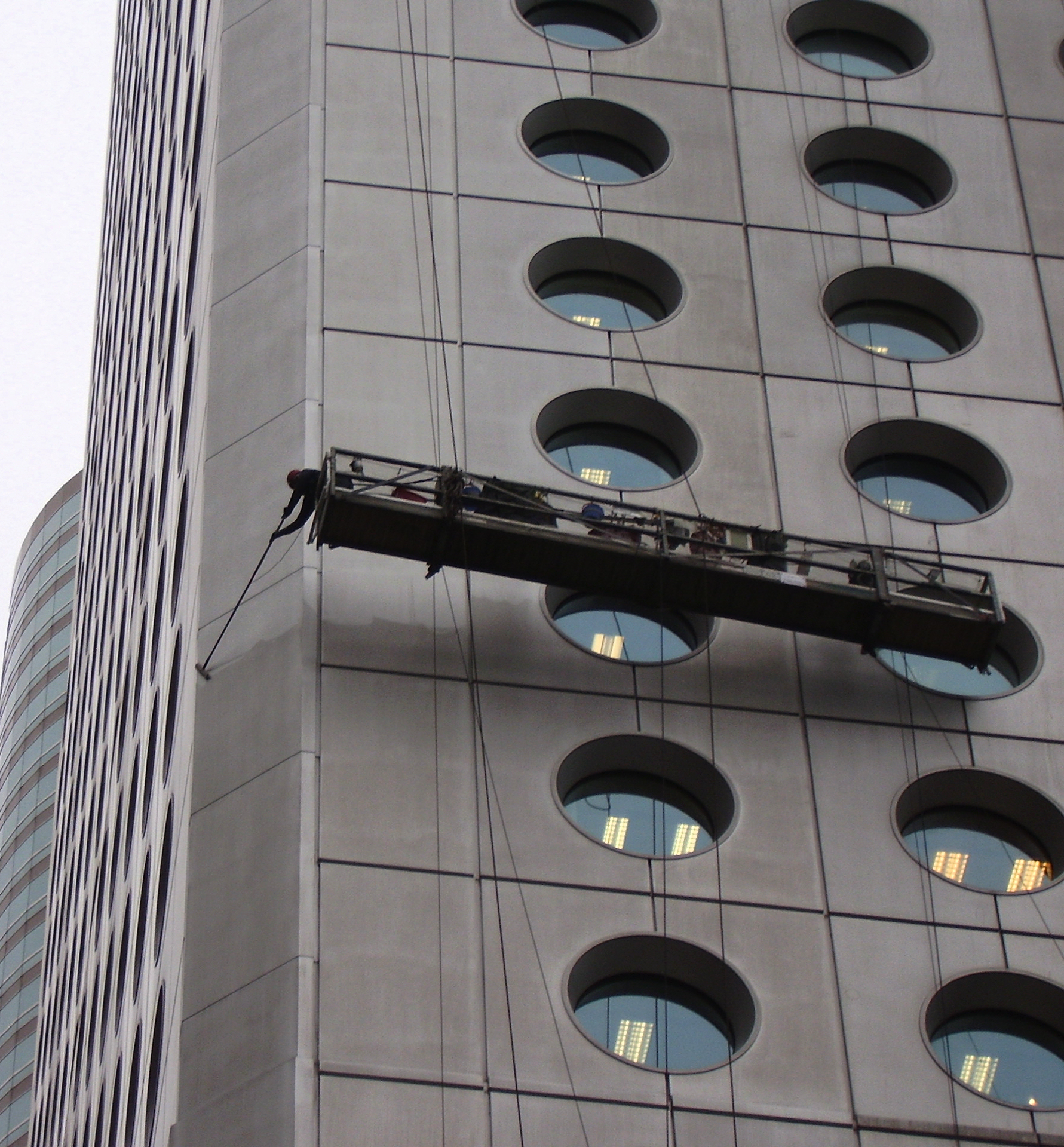
Workers scrub the outside of a skyscraper in Hong Kong.

Exterior cleaning is the process of cleaning a building's exterior part including the restoration of hygiene or removal of litter and/or dirt on the outside of the building. It is not to be confused with interior cleaning, the act of cleaning inside a building. Exterior cleaning draws on aspects of environmental care, architecture preservation, and public safety, in addition to traditional cleaning. In some jurisdictions, exterior cleaners must be licensed to practice, e.g., window cleaners require a license to operate in Scotland.

== Specializations ==
Exterior cleaning companies can focus on residential or commercial cleaning, and exterior cleaners may specialize in a particular field, e.g., the cleaning of bronze monuments or graffiti removal.

Exterior cleaners can specialize in:

- Bronze cleaning and restoration
- Cladding
- Conservatory roof cleaning
- Deck cleaning, staining and waxing
- Fascia (architecture)
- Glazing
- Gutters
- Graffiti removal and protection
- Patio furniture
- Paving
- Siding
- Sign cleaning
- Solar panel cleaning
- Stone cleaning and restoration
- Swimming pools

== See also ==
- Environmental psychology
- Roof cleaning
- Window cleaner
- Green cleaning
