= Domestic roof construction =

Construction of the roofs of houses

Diagram of roof construction.

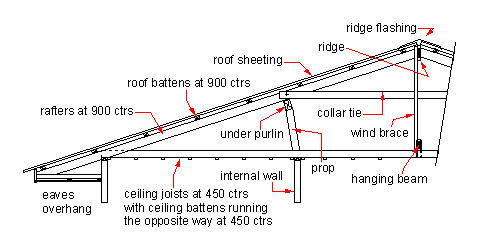
Section view through a house roof drawing showing names for parts of the structure. (UK and Australia). Ctrs. means centers, a typical line to which carpenters layout framing

Domestic roof construction is the framing and roof covering which is found on most detached houses in cold and temperate climates. Such roofs are built with mostly timber, take a number of different shapes, and are covered with a variety of materials.

== Overview ==
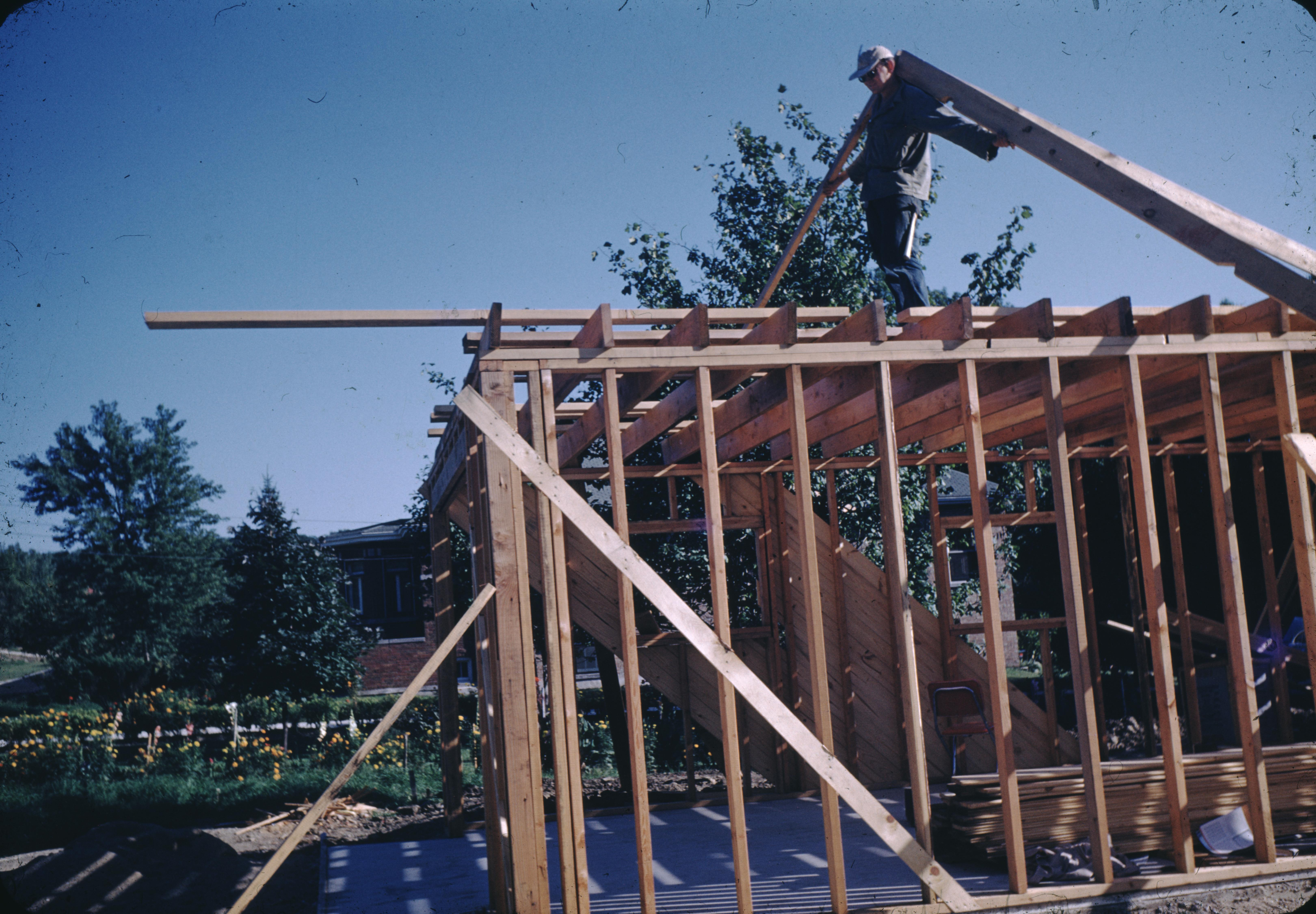
A roof being framed in the United States circa 1955

Modern timber roofs are mostly framed with pairs of common rafters or prefabricated wooden trusses fastened together with truss connector plates. Timber framed and historic buildings may be framed with principal rafters or timber roof trusses. Roofs are also designated as warm or cold roof depending on the way they are designed and built with regard to thermal building insulation and ventilation. The steepness or roof pitch of a sloped roof is determined primarily by the roof covering material and aesthetic design. Flat roofs actually slope up to approximately ten degrees to shed water. Flat roofs on houses are primarily found in arid regions.

In high-wind areas, such as where a cyclone or hurricane may make landfall, the main engineering consideration is to hold the roof down during severe storms . This is accomplished by using metal ties fastened to each rafter or truss. This is not normally a problem in areas not prone to high wind or extreme weather conditions.

In the UK, a concrete tiled roof would normally have rafters at 600 mm (24 in) centers, roof battens at 300 mm (12 in) centers and ceiling joists at 400 mm (16 in) centers. The United States still uses imperial units of measurement and framing members are typically spaced sixteen or twenty-four inches apart.

The roof framing may be interrupted for openings such as a chimney or skylight. Chimneys are typically built with a water diverter known as a cricket or saddle above the chimney. Flashing is used to seal the gap between the chimney and roofing material.

== Rafter roofs ==
A simple rafter roof consists of rafters that the rafter foot rest on horizontal wall plates on top of each wall. The top ends of the rafters often meet at a ridge beam, but may butt directly to another rafter to form a pair of rafters called a couple. Depending on the roof covering material, either horizontal laths, battens, or purlins are fixed to the rafters; or boards, plywood, or oriented strand board form the roof deck (also called the sheeting or sheathing) to support the roof covering. Heavier under purlins or purlin plates are used to support longer rafter spans. Tie beams, which may also serve as ceiling joists, are typically connected between the lower ends of opposite rafters to prevent them from spreading and forcing the walls apart. Collar beams or collar ties may be fixed higher up between opposite rafters for extra strength. The rafters, tie beams and plates serve to transmit the weight of the roof to the walls of the building

== Truss roofs ==
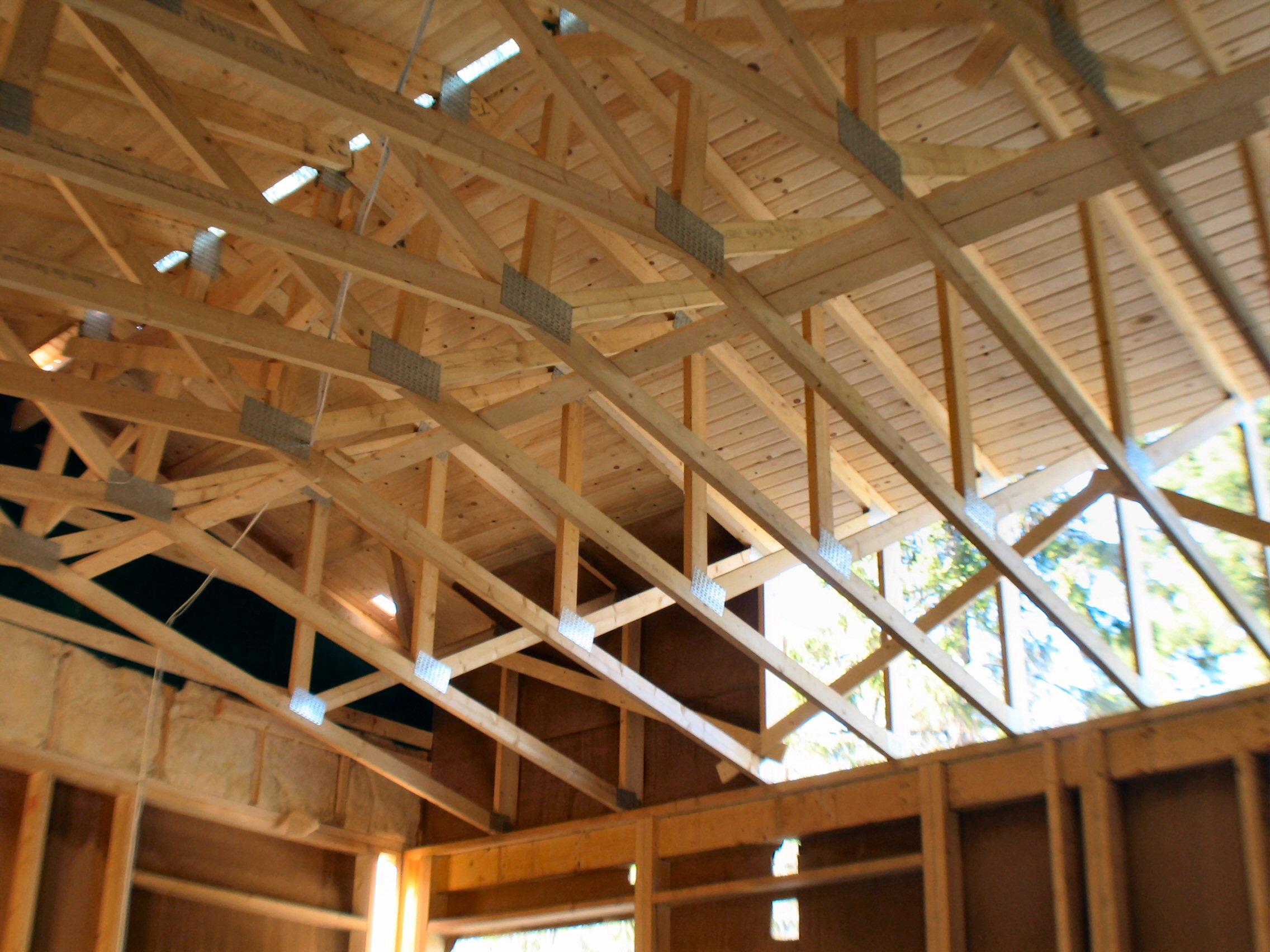
A truss roof with tongue and groove sheathing. The gap in the sheathing at the ridge is the space designed to allow natural ventilation.

Pre-manufactured roof trusses come in a wide variety of styles. They are designed by the manufacturer for each specific building.

Timber trusses also are built in a variety of styles using wood or metal joints. Heavy timber rafters typically spaced 240 cm (8 ft) to 370 cm (12 ft) apart are called principal rafters. Principal rafters may be mixed with common rafters or carry common purlins.

== Design loads ==
Roof framing must be designed to hold up a structural load including what is called dead load, its own weight and the weight of the roof covering, and additional loading called the environmental load such as snow and wind. Flat roofs may also need to be designed for live loads if people can walk on them. In the United States, building codes specify the loads in pounds per square foot which vary by region. The load and span (distance between supports) defines the size and spacing of the rafters and trusses.

== Roof covering ==
The roofing material, including underlayment and roof covering, is primarily designed to shed water. The covering is also a major element of the architecture, so roofing materials come in a wide variety of colors and textures. The primary roof covering on houses in North America are asphalt shingles, but some have other types of roof shingles or metal roofs. Tile and thatch roofs are more common in Europe than North America. Some roofing materials help reduce air conditioning costs in hot climates by being designed to reflect light.

Asphalt shingles are the most used roofing material in North America, making up as much as 75% of all steep slope roofs. This type of material is also gaining popularity in Europe due to lower installation costs. Asphalt shingles dominate the North American residential roofing market, because they are typically less expensive compared to other materials.

In the southern US and Mexico, clay tile roofs are also very popular, due to their longevity, and ability to withstand hurricane winds with minimal or no damage.

In Europe, slate and tile roofs are very popular. Many slate roofs in Europe are over 100 years old, and typically require minimal maintenance / repairs.

== Ventilation and insulation ==
Roof space ventilation is needed to regulate the temperature within the roof space. Without proper ventilation, humidity can cause interstitial condensation within the roof fabric; this can lead to serious structural damage, wet or dry rot, and can ruin insulation.

Condensation within the roof space is bigger problem today due to: less fortuitous ventilation due to tighter building envelopes with high performance windows and door and no chimneys leading. This tighter envelope means the air temperature in buildings has risen, the warmer the air in the building is, the more water vapour the air can carry.

As the occupied part of the building has become warmer, the roof space has become colder, with high performance insulation and roofing membranes leading to a cold roof space.

When the warm, moist air from below rises into the cold roof space, condensation begins as the air temperature drops to the ‘dew point’ or as the warm air comes into contact with any of the cold surfaces in the roof.

Most building materials are permeable to water vapour; brick, concrete, plaster, wood and insulation all can fall victim to interstitial condensation. This is why UK Building Regulations require roofs to be ventilated, either by the use of soffit vents, ridge vents, or replacement ventilation slates or tiles.

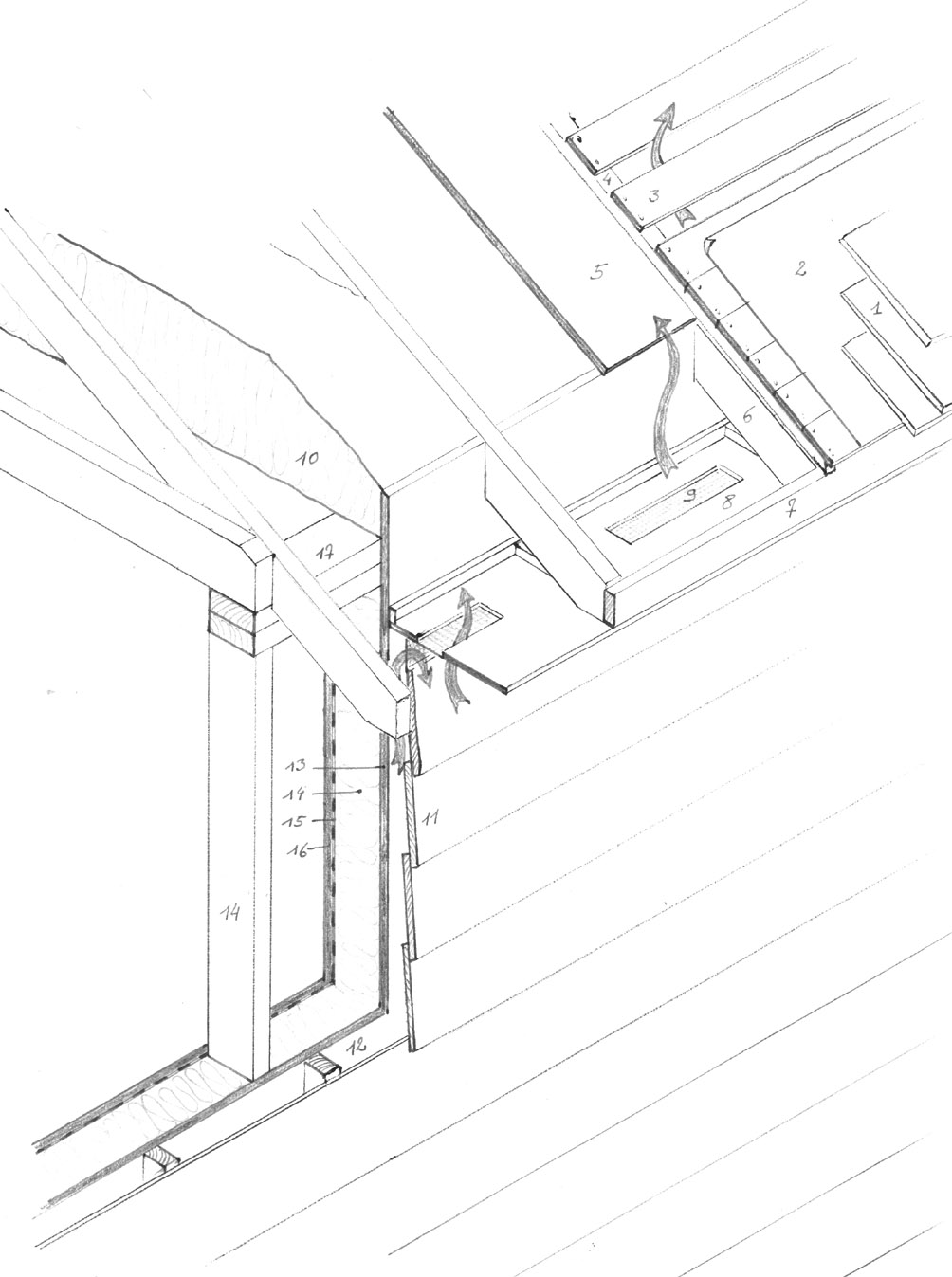
A common method of ventilating a roof is to make openings in the soffit and ridge to allow natural air flow. This example also has ventilated exterior walls called rainscreen construction.

Ventilation of the roof deck speeds the evaporation of water from leakage or condensation and removes heat which helps prevent ice dams and helps asphalt shingles last longer. Building codes in the U.S. specify ventilation rates as a minimum of 1 sq ft (0.093 m^{2}) of opening per 150 sq ft (14 m^{2}) (1:150) with a ratio of 1:300 in some conditions. Warm air rises, so ceiling insulation is designed to have a higher r-value and the insulation is often installed between the ceiling joists or rafters. A properly insulated and ventilated roof is called a cold roof. A warm roof is a roof that is not ventilated, where the insulation is placed in line with the roof pitch. A hot roof is a roof designed not to have any ventilation and has enough air-impermeable insulation in contact with the sheathing to prevent condensation such as when spray foam insulation is applied directly to the under-side or top-side of the roof deck or in some cathedral ceilings.

A more recent design is the installation of a roof deck with foil-backed foam along with a second deck that is air-gapped away from the foil-backed foam to allow air to flow vertically to a ventilation outlet at the peak of the roof—it is a double-deck design with an air gap. This design improves efficiency.

== Primitive roofing techniques ==
In the Near East, from Roman times, throughout the Middle Ages and up to the start of the 20th-century, roofs of houses were constructed in the following manner: They first arranged the wooden rafters over the walls, at a distance of about 60 cm between each rafter; over which rafters they laid down horizontally thin strips of wood, or boards (purlins), in close proximity to each other, each board having a thickness of 3 finger-breadths (6.75 cm), or a little less. Over these boards they then firmly secured in place a matting material made of natural plant fibers woven together, such as cane reeds, leaves of rush or papyrus, palm fronds and tree bark. Over this matting material they first placed a thick layer of clay, followed by a layer of soil having a thickness of 20 centimetres (7.9 in), after which they daubed the top with a clay aggregate consisting of a cement mixture of clay, rubble, crushed potsherds and straw. This type of roofing material is well-equipped to withstand wetness and rain downpours.

In Sanaa, Yemen, in the early 20th-century, twisted mats of palm-leaves were laid over wooden beams used to support the ceilings. These mats were held in place by wooden sticks laid at right angles to the beams. Above these crossing sticks, bushes were spread, and these were again covered with mats. The wooden beams and the mats were overlaid with a very hard lime or mortar coating. The thickness of the ceiling-wall seldom exceeded 30 centimetres (12 in), excluding the beams.

In ancient Gaul, Spain, Portugal and Aquitaine, houses were constructed with peaked roofs daubed with lumps of dried mud and covered with reeds and leaves, while other roofs made with oak shingles or thatched. The Colchians in Pontus made their roofs by "cutting away the ends of crossbeams, and [by] making them converge gradually as they lay them across, they bring them up to the top from the four sides in the shape of a pyramid. They [then] cover it with leaves and mud." In Marseilles, during classical antiquity, tiles were not used on the roofs of houses, but rather only earth mixed with straw. The ancient Phrygians built a pyramidal roof of logs fastened together, and covering them over with reeds and brushwood, upon which was heaped up very high mounds of earth.

== Gallery ==
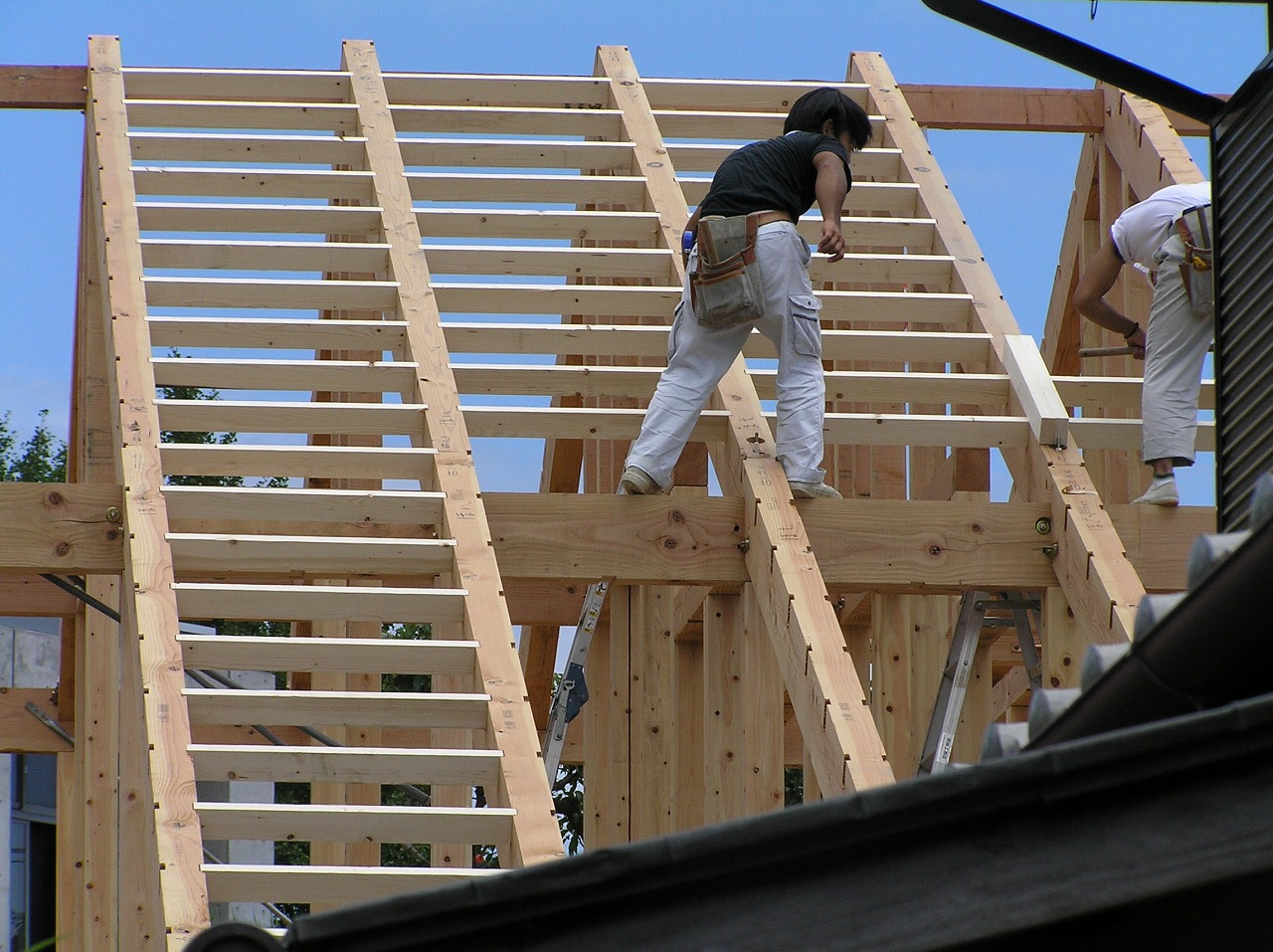
A steeply pitched, timber framed roof under construction in Japan

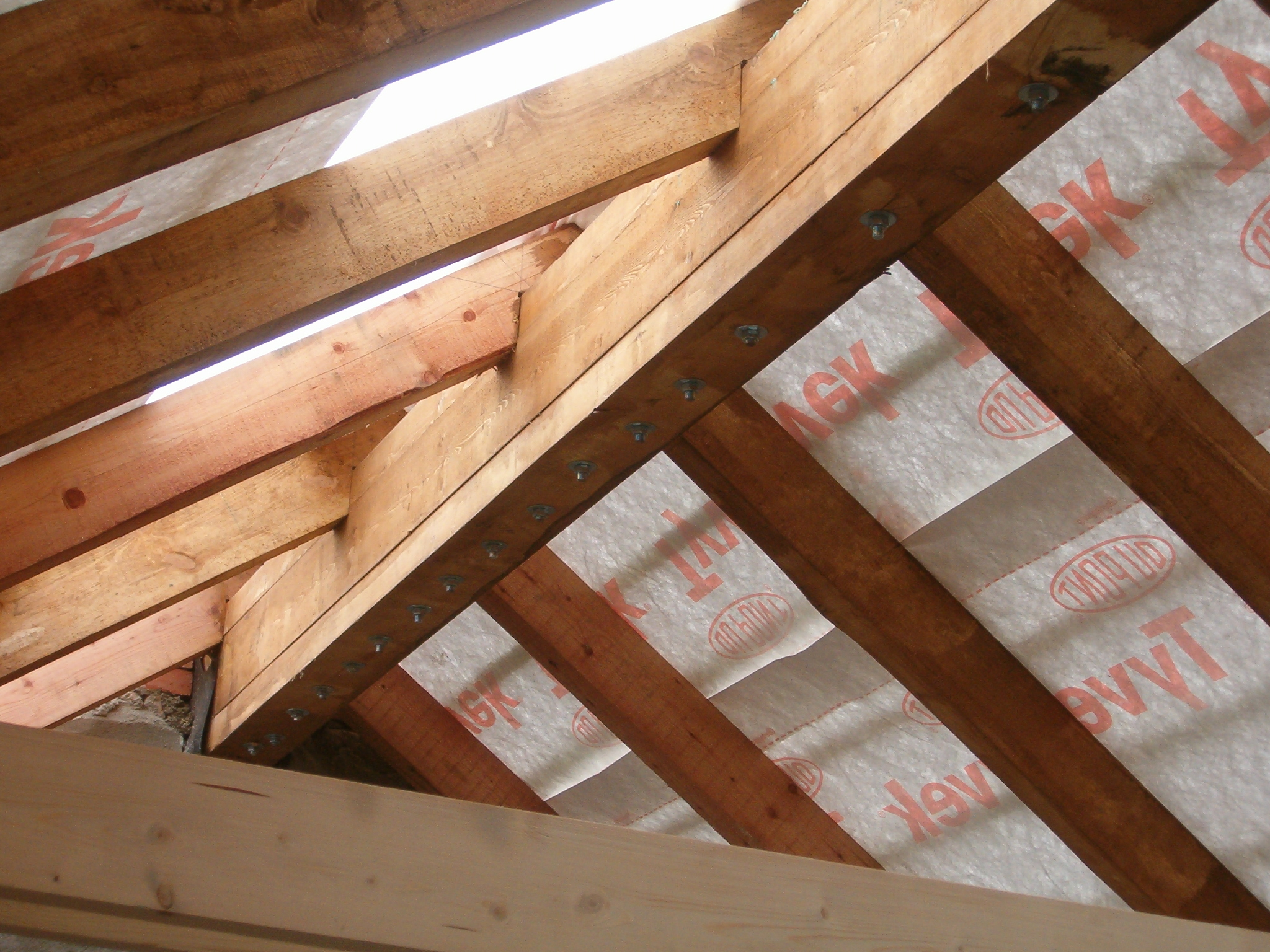
A heavy ridge beam and rafters. A tie or joist visible in foreground

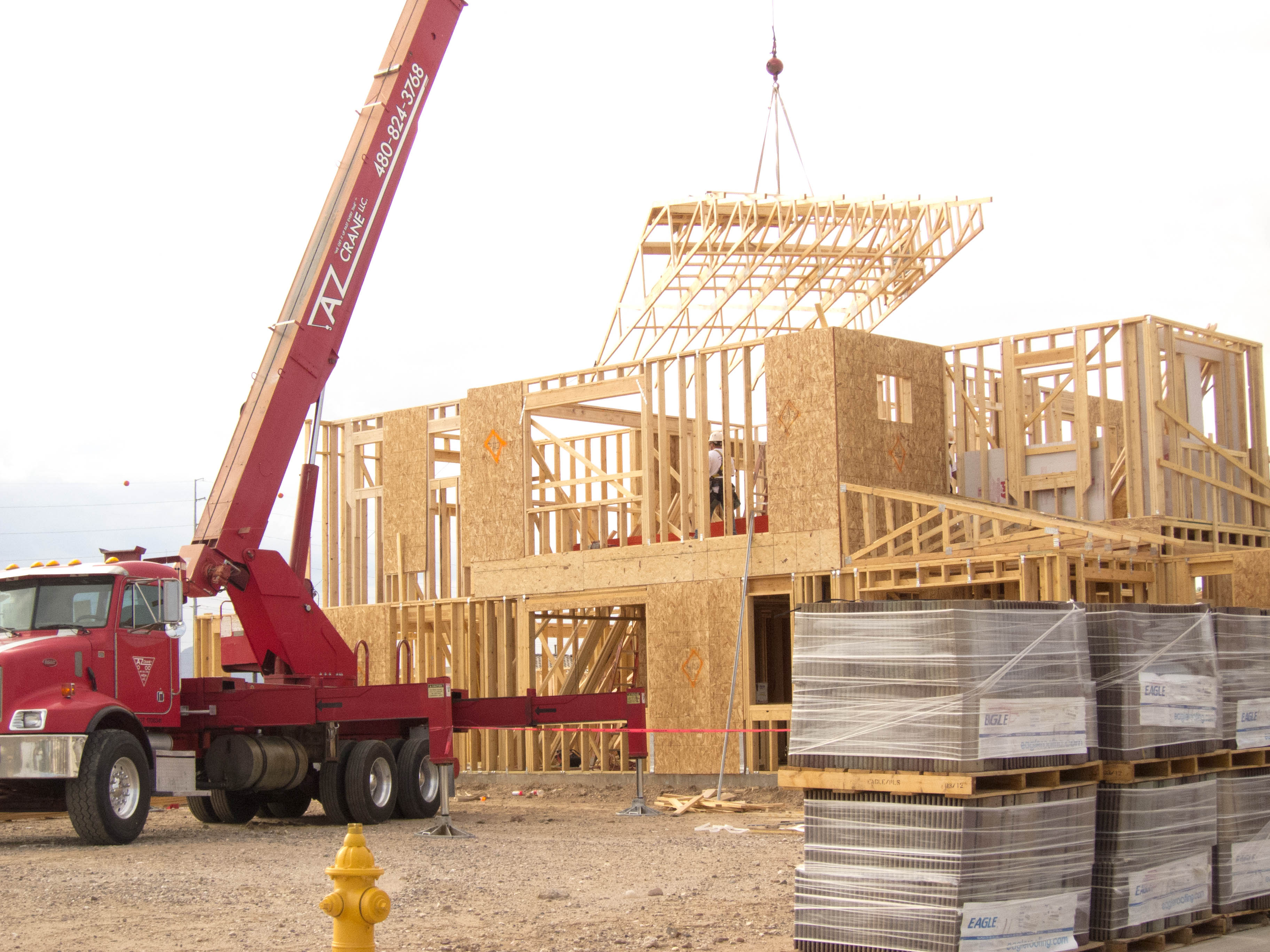
A set of trusses placed atop a home under construction

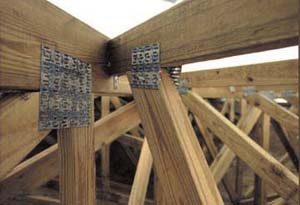
A strongly reinforced roof structure in a cyclone-prone area

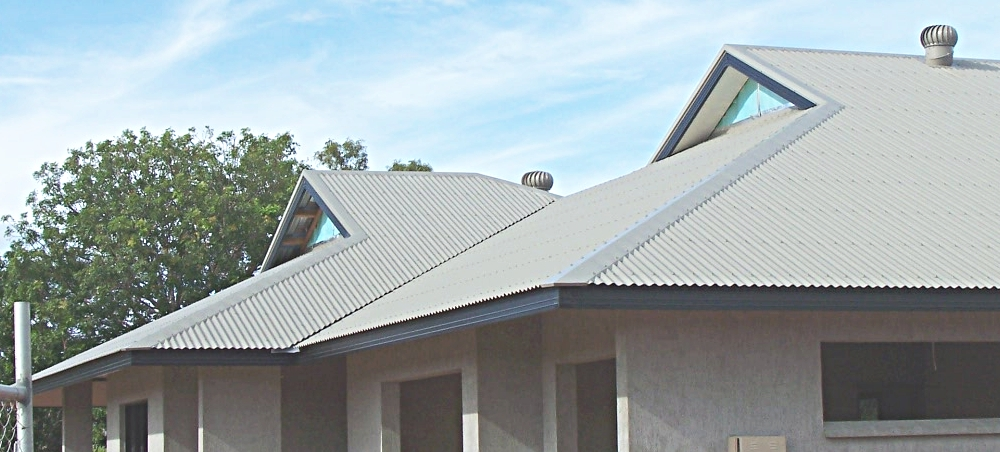
Applying corrugated iron sheeting to a house under construction. Shows two gables and external cyclonic fastenings

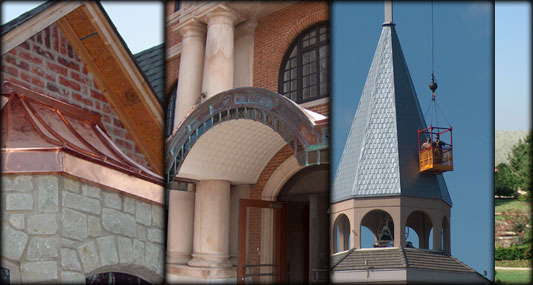
Example of architectural roof designs

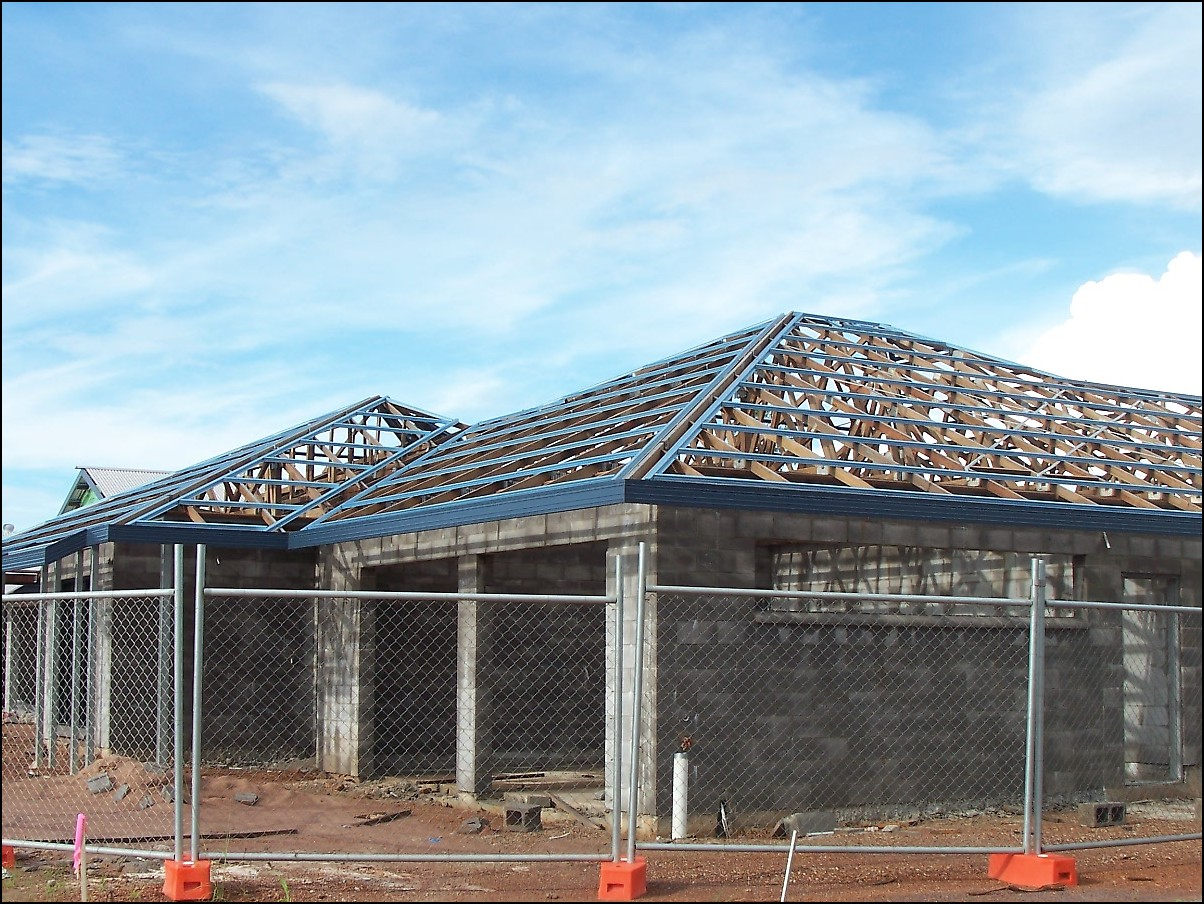
A hip roof construction in Northern Australia showing multinail truss construction. The blue pieces are roll formed metal roof battens or purlins. This roof is built with purpose-made steel hook bracket which is bolted to the truss with M16 bolt. The bracket is bolted to an M16 bolt cast in situ, embedded 300 mm (12 in) into the reinforced concrete block wall. This system is typically in place every 900 mm (35 in) around perimeter

== See also ==
- Dropped ceiling
- Roof garden
- Tented roof
- Building construction
- Building envelope
- Copper roofing
- Green roof
- List of roof shapes
- Metal Roofing Alliance
- Roof cleaning
- Roofer
- Roofing felt
- Tensile architecture
- Thin-shell structure
- Pahuichi
