= Roofer =

Profession specialising in building roof construction

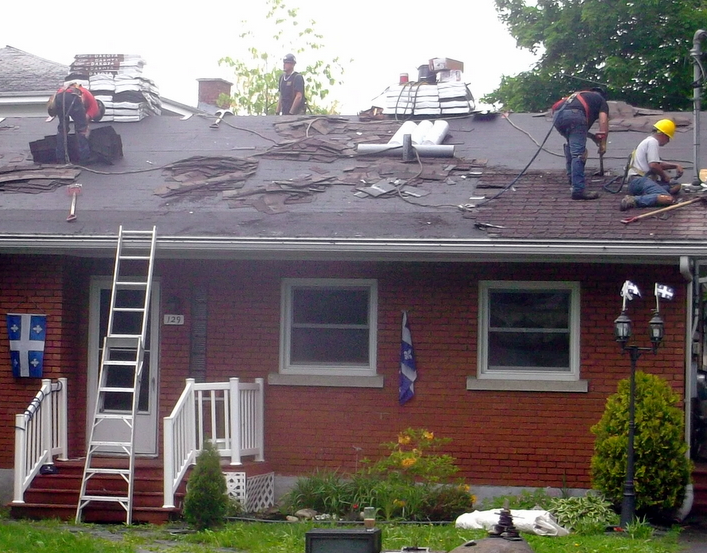
- Roofers working on a bungalow in Brompton, Quebec

Occupation
- Occupation type: Vocational
- Activity sectors: Construction

Description
- Competencies: Heights, patience, steady hand, ability to read plans, physically strong
- Education required: Apprenticeship
- Fields of employment: Construction
- Related jobs: Carpenter, Electrician, Plumber, Welder

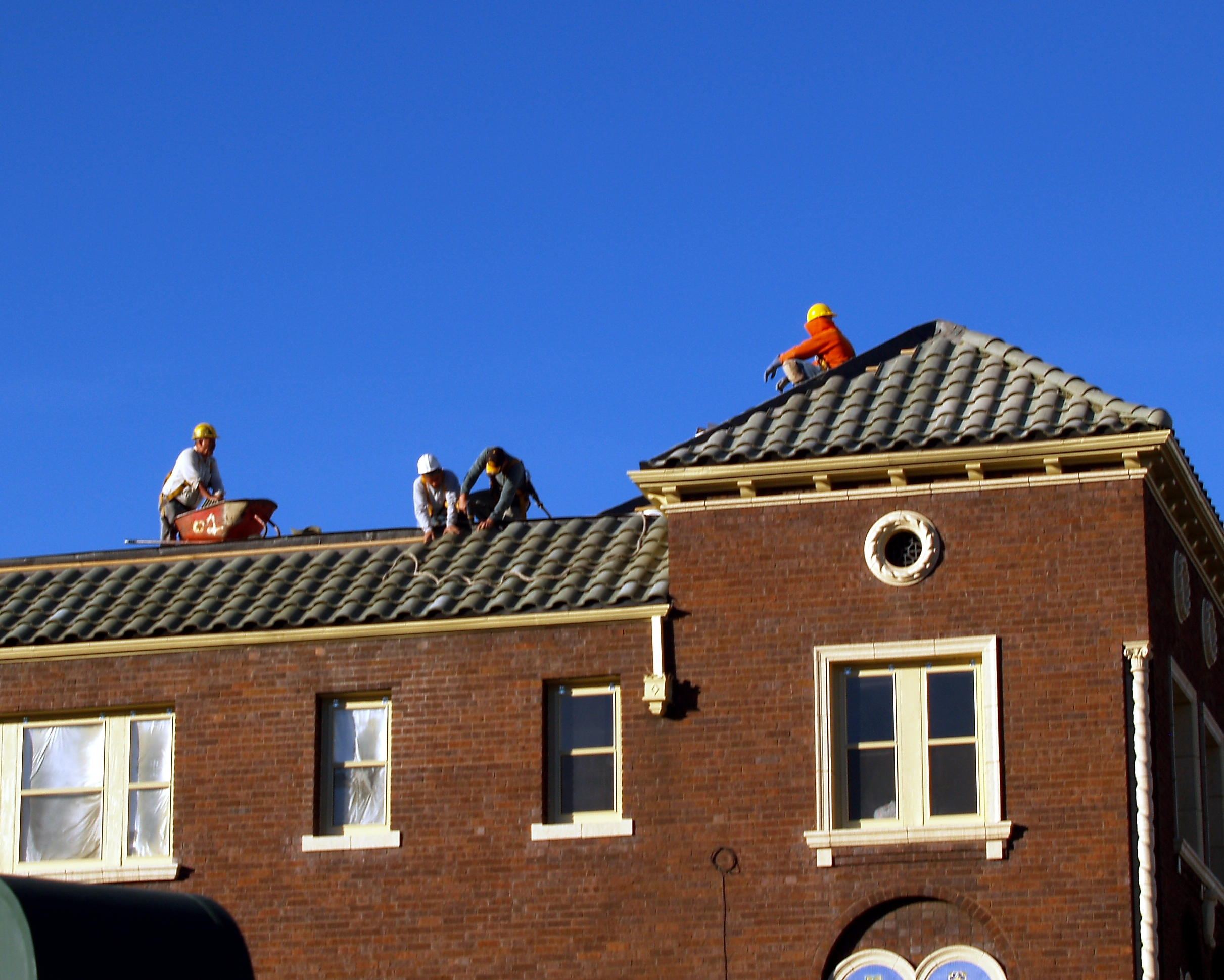
Roofers laying a tiled roof in Denver, Colorado

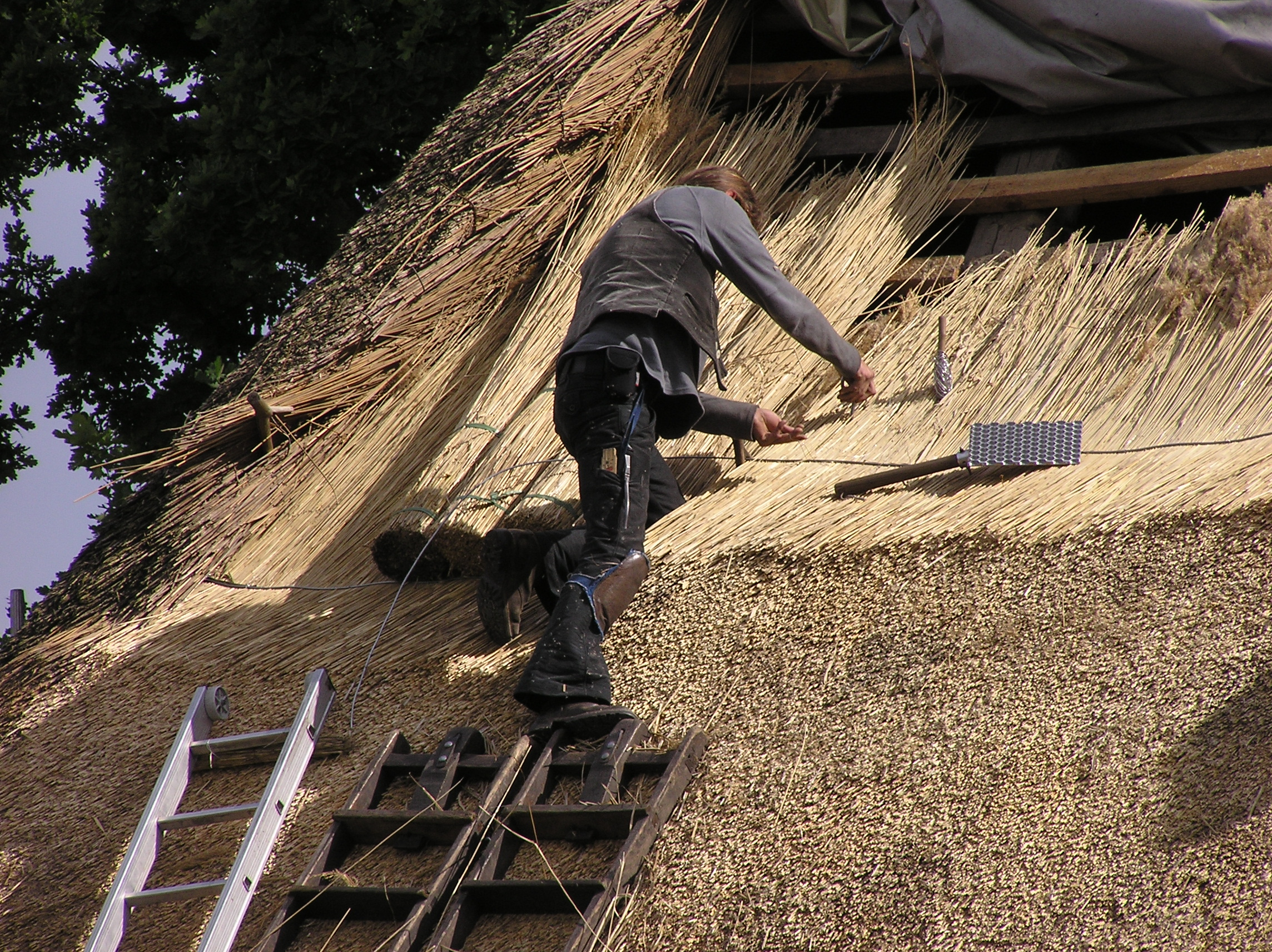
A German roofer installing a reed roof, wearing the traditional vest and trousers of a craftsperson

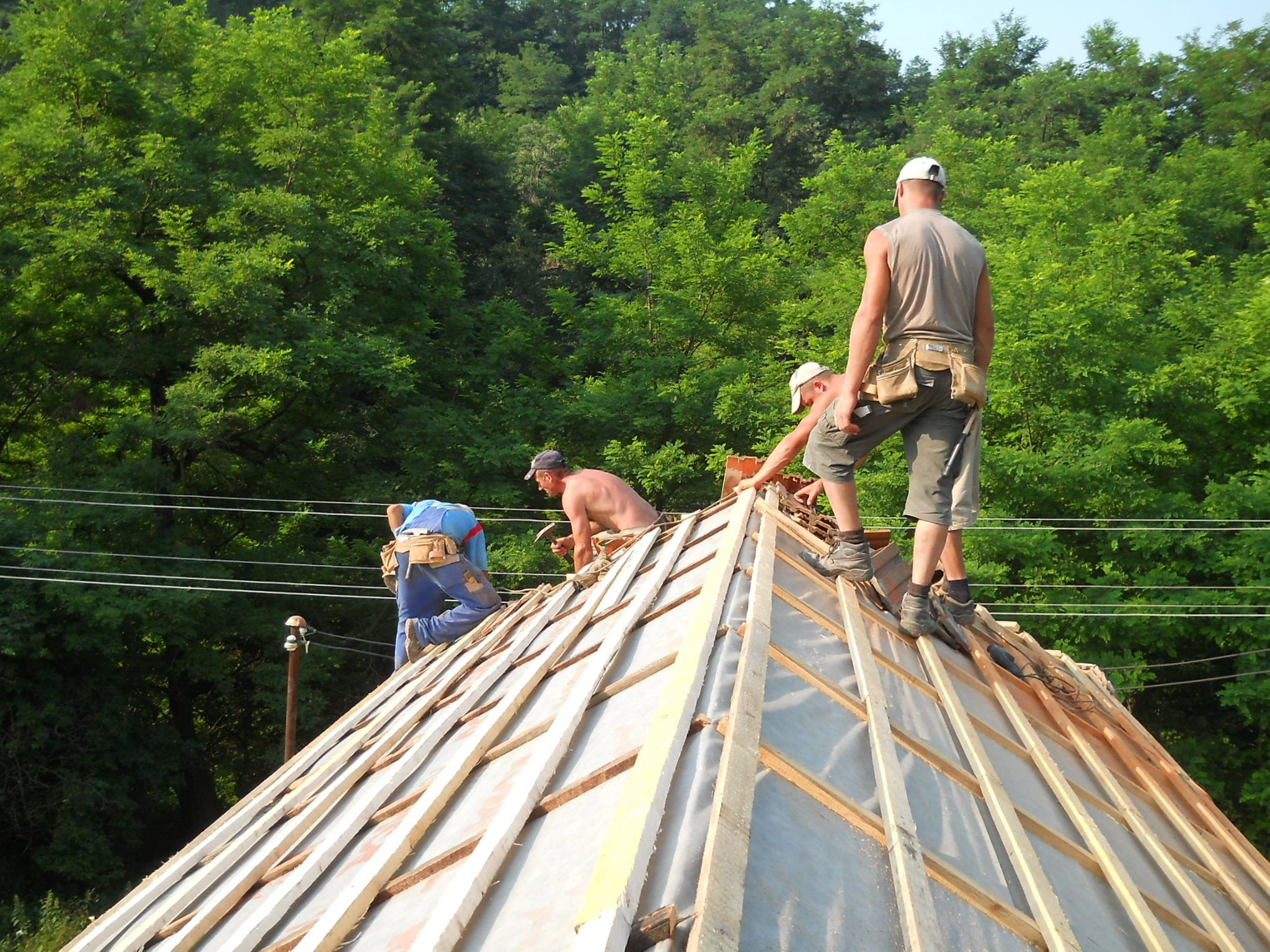
Roofers in Romania installing wooden roof tiles

A roofer, roof mechanic, or roofing contractor is a tradesperson who specializes in roof construction. Roofers replace, repair, and install the roofs of buildings, using a variety of materials, including shingles, single-ply, bitumen, and metal. Roofing work includes the hoisting, storage, application, and removal of roofing materials and equipment, including related insulation, sheet metal, vapor barrier work, and green technologies rooftop jobs such as vegetative roofs, rainwater harvesting systems, and photovoltaic products, such as solar shingles and solar tiles.

Roofing work can be physically demanding because it may involve heavy lifting, climbing, bending, and kneeling, often in extreme weather conditions. Roofers are also vulnerable to falls from heights due to working at elevated heights. Various protective measures are required in many countries. In the United States these requirement are established by the Occupational Safety and Health Administration (OSHA) to address this concern. Several resources from occupational health agencies are available on implementing the required and other recommended interventions.

== Global usage ==
According to data from the U.S. Bureau of Labor Statistics (BLS), as of May 2022, there were 129,300 individuals working as roofers in the construction industry. Among that population, a majority of roofers (93%; 119,800) were contractors for Foundation, Structure, and Building Exterior projects. In terms of jobs outlook, it is predicted that there will only be a 2% increase in job growth from 2022 to 2032 in the United States. Approximately 12,200 openings are expected each year in this decade. Most of the new jobs are likely to be offered to replace roofers who retire or transition out of the trade.

In Australia, this type of carpenter is called a roof carpenter and the term roofer refers to someone who installs the roof cladding (tiles, tin, etc.). The number of roofers in Australia was estimated to be approximately 15,000. New South Wales is the largest province with an 29% market share in the Australian Roofers industry (4,425 companies). Second is Victoria with 3,206 Roofers (21%).

In the United States and Canada, they're often referred to as roofing contractors or roofing professionals. The most common roofing material in the United States is asphalt shingles. In the past, 3-tab shingles were used, but recent trends show "architectural" or "dimensional" shingles becoming very popular.

Depending on the region, other commonly applied roofing materials installed by roofers include concrete tiles, clay tiles, natural or synthetic slate, single-ply (primarily EPDM rubber, PVC, or TPO), rubber shingles (made from recycled tires), glass, metal panels or shingles, wood shakes or shingles, liquid-applied, hot asphalt/rubber, foam, thatch, and solar tiles. "Living roof" systems, or rooftop landscapes, have become increasingly common in recent years in both residential and commercial applications.

== Roles, responsibilities, and tasks ==
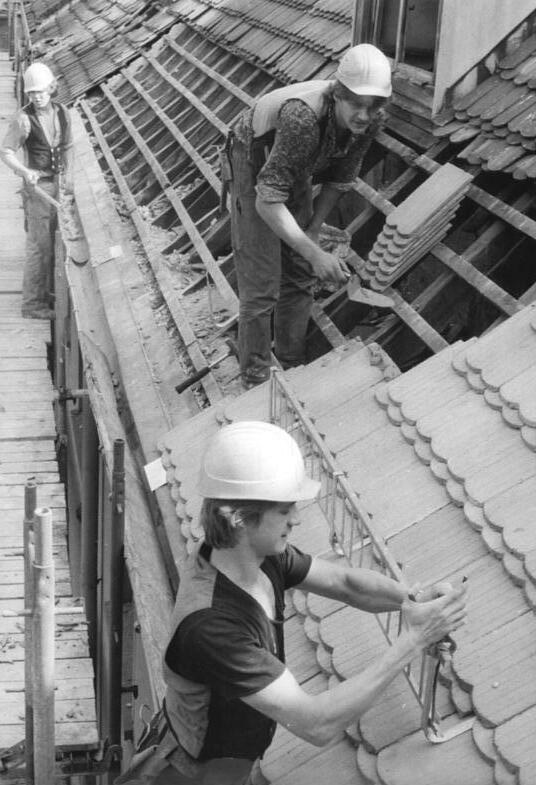
Roofers in Lichtenberg in 1984 Credit: Bernd Settnik, German Federal Archives

Roles and responsibilities of roofing professionals include:

- Assessing the roof system and components (may include decking and structural components)
- Determining the proper roofing system for the building
- Installing roof system components according to manufacturer’s specifications
- Repairing the roof system
- Maintenance of the roof system

Beyond having common duties such as replacing, repairing, or installing roofs for buildings, roofers can also be involved in other tasks, including but is not limited to:

- Seal exposed heads of nails or screws using roofing cement or caulk to avert possible water infiltration
- Tailor roofing materials to accommodate architectural elements such as walls or vents
- Align the installed materials with the roof's edges to ensure a proper fit
- Apply various roofing materials such as shingles, asphalt, metal, etc., to render the roof impervious to weather conditions
- Establish roof ventilation mechanisms to regulate airflow and control temperature fluctuations
- Set up moisture barriers or insulation layers to improve the roof's thermal performance
- Dismantle the current roof systems to make ways for repairs or new installations
- Substitute impaired or decaying joists or plywood to maintain the roof's structural integrity
- Assess roof dimensions to assess the necessary amount of required materials
- Conduct evaluations on problematic roofs to determine the most effective repair approach

== Hazards ==
Roofing is one of the most dangerous professions among construction occupations since it involves working at heights and exposes workers to dangerous weather conditions such as extreme heat. In the United States as of 2017, the rate of fatalities from falls among roofers is 36 deaths per 100,000 full-time employees, ten times greater than all construction-related professions combined. In the United States, the fatal injury rate in 2021 was 59.0 per 100,000 full-time roofers, compared to the national average of 3.6 per 100,000 full-time employees. According to the U.S. Bureau of Labor Statistics, roofing has been within the top 5 highest death rates of any profession for over 10 years in a row. For Hispanic roofers, data from 2001–2008 show fatal injuries from falls account for nearly 80% of deaths in this population, the highest cause of death among Hispanics of any construction trade.

A major contributing factor to the high fatality rates among roofers in the United States is the nature of the craft which requires roofers to work on elevated, slanted roof surfaces. Findings from qualitative interviews with Michigan roofing contractors also found hand and finger injuries from handling heavy material and back injuries to be some of the more common task/injury combinations.

Ladder falls contribute to the rates of injury and mortality. More than half a million people per year are treated for fall from ladder and over 3000 people die as a result. In 2014 the estimated cost annual cost of ladder injuries, including time away from work, medical, legal, liability expenses was estimated to reach $24 billion. Male, Hispanic, older, self-employed workers and those who work in smaller establishments, and work doing construction, maintenance, and repair experience higher ladder fall injury rates when compared with women and non-Hispanic whites and persons of other races/ethnicities.

Ladders allow for roofers to access upper level work surfaces. For safe use, ladder must be inspected for damage by a competent person and must be used on stable and level surfaces unless they are secured to prevent displacement.

== Safety measures ==
Nearly every industrialized country has established specific safety regulations for work on the roof, ranging from the use of conventional fall protection systems including personal fall arrest systems, guardrail systems, and safety nets.

The European Agency for Safety and Health at Work describes scenarios of risk (fall prevention, falling materials, types of roofs), precautions, training needed and European legislation focused on roof work. European directives set minimum standards for health and safety and are transposed into law in all Member States.

In the United States, OSHA standards require employers to have several means of fall protection available to ensure the safety of workers. In construction, this applies to workers who are exposed to falls of 6 feet or more above lower levels. In the United States, regulation of the roofing trade is left up to individual states. Some states leave roofing regulation up to city-level, county-level, and municipal-level jurisdictions. Unlicensed contracting of projects worth over a set threshold may result in stiff fines or even time in prison. In some states, roofers are required to meet insurance and roofing license guidelines. Roofers are also required to display their license number on their marketing material.

Canada's rules are very similar to those from the U.S., and regulatory authority depends on where the business is located and fall under the authority of their local province.

In 2009, in response to high rates of falls in constructions the Japanese Occupational Safety and Health Regulations and Guidelines amended their specific regulations. In 2013 compliance was low and the need for further research and countermeasures for preventing falls and ensuring fall protection from heights was identified.

The United Kingdom has no legislation in place that requires a roofer to have a license to trade, although some do belong to recognized trade organizations.

=== Personal fall arrest system (PFAS) ===
The purpose of a PFAS is to halt a fall and prevent the worker from making bodily contact with a surface below. The PFAS consists of an anchorage, connectors, body harness and may include a lanyard, deceleration device, lifeline or suitable combination of these.

Beyond these mandatory components of the PFAS, there are also specific fall distances associated with the functioning of the arrest system. Specifically, there is a total fall distance that the PFAS must allow for to assist the worker in avoiding contact with the ground or other surface below. The total fall distance consists of free fall distance, deceleration distance, D-ring shift, Back D-ring height, and Safety margin. In addition to the fall distance requirements for each component of the PFAS, the anchorage of the PFAS must also be able to support a minimum 5,000 pounds per worker.

OSHA regulations have several requirements. The free fall distance, to the distance that the worker drops before the PFAS begins to work and slows the speed of the fall, must be 6 feet or less, nor contact any lower level. The deceleration, the length that the lanyard must stretch in order to arrest the fall must be no more than 3.5 feet. The D-ring shift, the distance that the harness stretches and how far the D-ring itself moves when it encounters the full weight of the worker during a fall, is generally assumed to be 1 foot, depending on the equipment design and the manufacturer of the harness. For the back D-ring height, the distance between the D-ring and the sole of the worker's footwear, employers often use 5 feet as the standard height with the assumption that the worker will be 6 feet in height, but because the D-ring height variability can affect the safety of the system, the back D-ring height must be calculated based on the actual height of the worker. The safety margin, the additional distance that is needed to ensure sufficient clearance between the worker and the surface beneath the worker after a fall occurs, is generally considered to be a minimum of 2 feet.

=== Fall restraint system ===
A fall restraint system is a type of fall protection system where, the goal is to stop workers from reaching the unprotected sides or edges of a working area in which a fall can subsequently occur. This system is useful where a worker may lose their footing near an unprotected edge or begin sliding. In such a case, the fall restraint system will restrain further movement of the worker toward the unprotected side or edge and prevent a serious fall. Although fall restraint systems are not explicitly defined or mentioned in OSHA's fall protection standards for construction, they are allowed by OSHA as specified in an OSHA letter of interpretation last updated in 2004. OSHA does not have any specific requirements for fall restraint systems, but recommends that any fall restraint system be capable of withstanding 3,000 pounds or at least twice the maximum predicted force necessary to save the worker from falling to the lower surface. There are no OSHA specifications on the distance from the edge the restraint system must allow for a falling worker, and although a likely very dangerous practice, the OSHA letter of interpretation states that as long as the restraint system prevents the employee from falling off an edge, the employee can be restrained to "within inches of the edge."

=== Guardrail system ===
Guardrail systems serve as an alternative to PFAS and fall restraint systems by having permanent or temporary guardrails around the perimeter of the roof and any roof openings. OSHA requires the height of the top of the rail to be 39-45 inches above the working surface. Mid-rails must be installed midway between the top of the top rail and the walking/working surface when there is no parapet wall at least 21 inches high. Guardrail systems must be capable of withstanding 200-pounds of force in any outward or downward direction applied within 2 inches of the top edge of the rail.

=== Safety net system ===
Safety net systems use a tested safety net adjacent to and below the edge of the walking/working surface to catch a worker who may fall off the roof. Safety nets must be installed as close as practicable under the surface where the work is being performed and shall extend outward from the outermost projection of the work surface as follows:

Vertical distance from working level to horizontal plane of net	Minimum required horizontal distance of outer edge of net from the edge of net from the edge of the working surface
Up to 5 feet	8 feet
More than 5 feet up to 10 feet	10 feet
More than 10 feet	13 feet

Safety nets must be drop-tested with a 400-pound bag of sand, or submit a certification record prior to its initial use.

=== Warning line system ===
Warning lines systems consist of ropes, wires, or chains which are marked every 6 feet with high-visibility material, and must be supported in such a way so that it is between 34 and 39 inches above the walking/working surface. Warning lines are passive systems that allow for a perimeter to be formed around the working area so that workers are aware of dangerous edges. Warning lines are only permitted on roofs with a low slope (having a slope of less than or equal to 4 inches of vertical rise for every 12 inches horizontal length (4:12)). In the context of roofing fall protection, warning line systems may only be used in combination with a guardrail system, a safety net system, a personal fall arrest system, or a safety monitoring system. The warning line system must be erected around all sides of the roof work area.

=== Safety monitoring systems ===
Safety monitoring systems use safety monitors to monitor the safety of other workers on the roof. Safety monitors must be competent to recognize fall hazards. The safety monitor is tasked to ensure the safety of other workers on the roof and must be able to orally warn an employee when they are in an unsafe situation.

=== Resources ===
Multi-layered approaches to fall prevention and protection that use the hierarchy of controls can help to prevent fall injuries, incidents, and fatalities in the roofing industry. The hierarchy of controls is a way of determining which actions will best control exposures. The hierarchy of controls has five levels of actions to reduce or remove hazards – elimination, substitution, and engineering controls are among the preferred preventive actions based on general effectiveness.

Resources are available to assist with the implementation of fall safety measures in the roofing industry such as fall prevention plans, a ladder safety mobile application, infographics and tipsheets, toolbox talks, videos and webinars, and safety leadership training. Many of these resources are available in Spanish and additional languages other than English. The recommended safety measures are described next.

== Emerging trends ==
=== Job outlook ===
In terms of job outlooks, it is predicted that there will only be an 1% increase in job growth from 2021 to 2032. The job openings (15,000) are expected to replace roofers who will retire or transition out of the trade.

=== Solar roofs ===
Solar Roof installation is one of the fastest growing trends in the roofing industry due to the nature of solar roofs being environmentally friendly and a worthwhile economic investment. Specifically, solar roofs have been found to allow homeowners to potentially save 40-70% on electric bills depending on the number of tiles installed. The US federal government has also begun incentivizing homeowners to install solar roofs with potential eligibility for 30% tax credit on the cost of a solar system based on federal income taxes.

=== Metal roofs ===
Across 14 researched markets, roofing contracting companies have reported that they have received more frequent calls regarding potential metal roof installations. For instance, one company used to receive 5-6 calls in total regarding metal installations but recently, they have received 5-6 calls weekly for inquiries regarding metal roof installations.

== See also ==
- Domestic roof construction
- Roof cleaning
- Flat roof
- Membrane roofing
- List of commercially available roofing materials
- Prevention through design
