= Window cleaner =

Cleaning of architectural glass used for structural, lighting, or decorative purposes

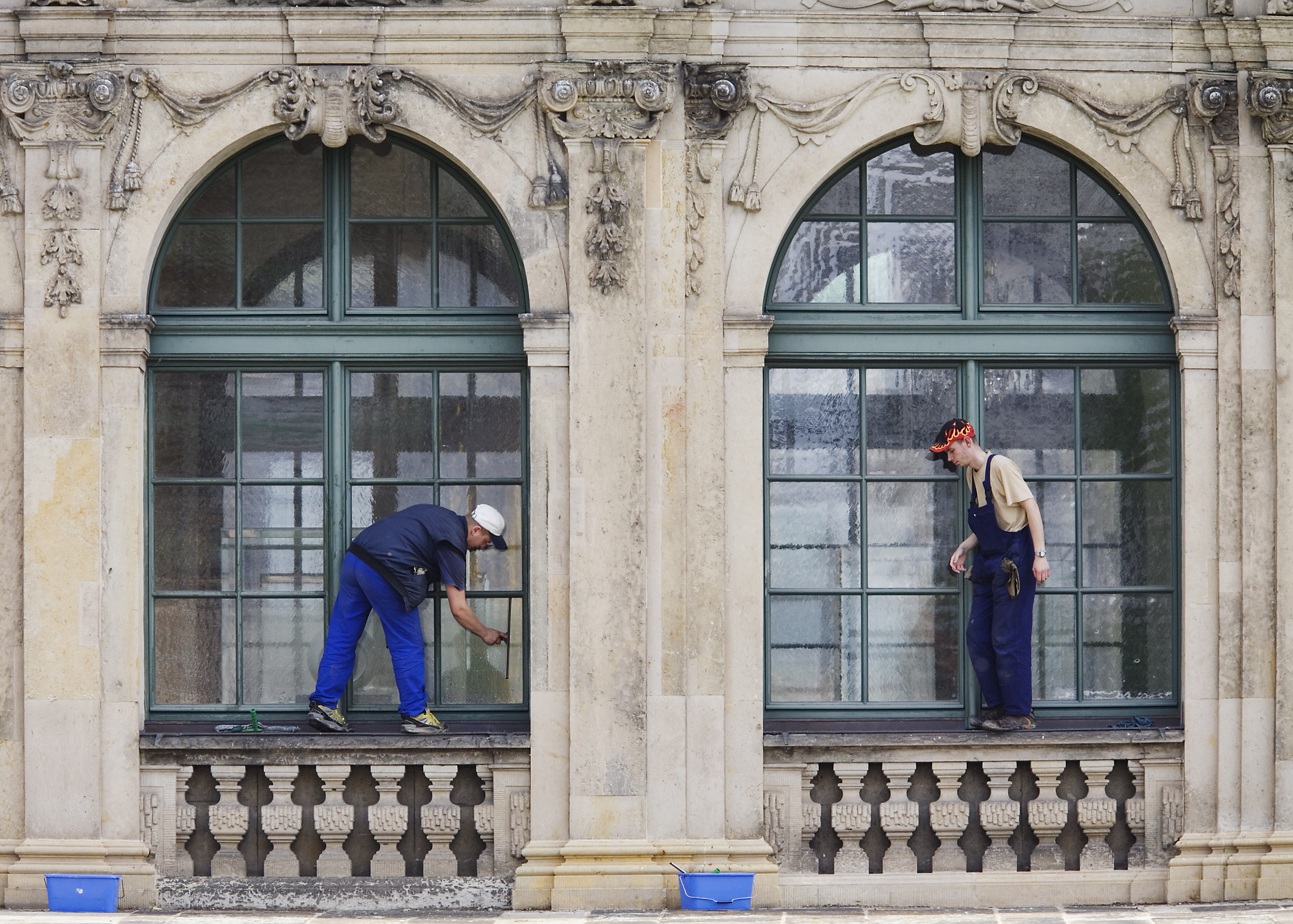
Window cleaners in Dresden

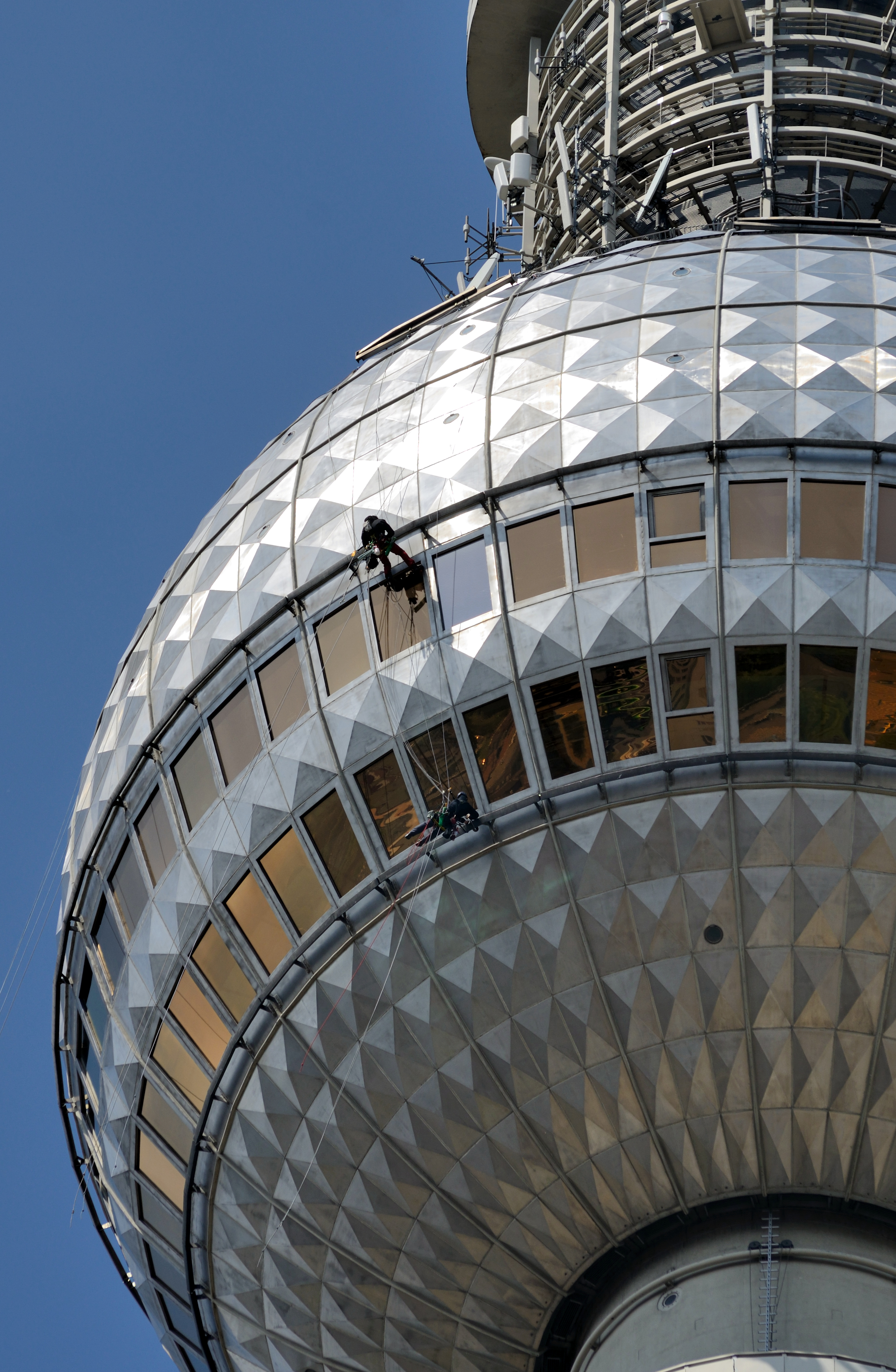
Cleaning the Fernsehturm Berlin

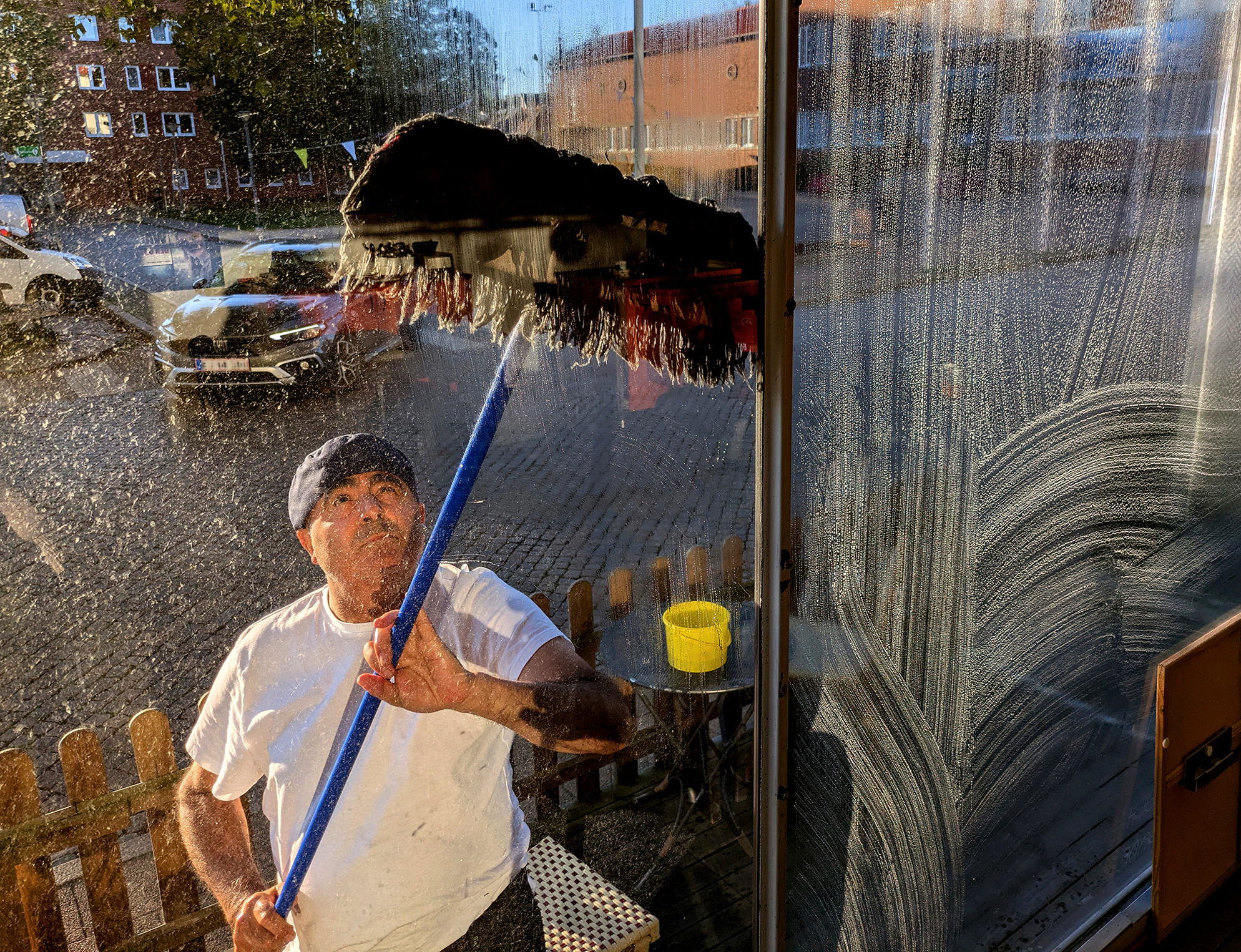
A man cleans windows at a cafe in central Ystad 2025.

Window cleaning, or window washing, is the exterior cleaning of architectural glass used for structural, lighting, or decorative purposes. It can be done manually, using a variety of tools for cleaning and access. Technology is also employed and increasingly, automation.

Commercial work is contracted variously from in-person transactions for cash or barter, to formal tender processes. Regulations, licensing, technique, equipment and compensation vary nationally and regionally.

== Tools ==
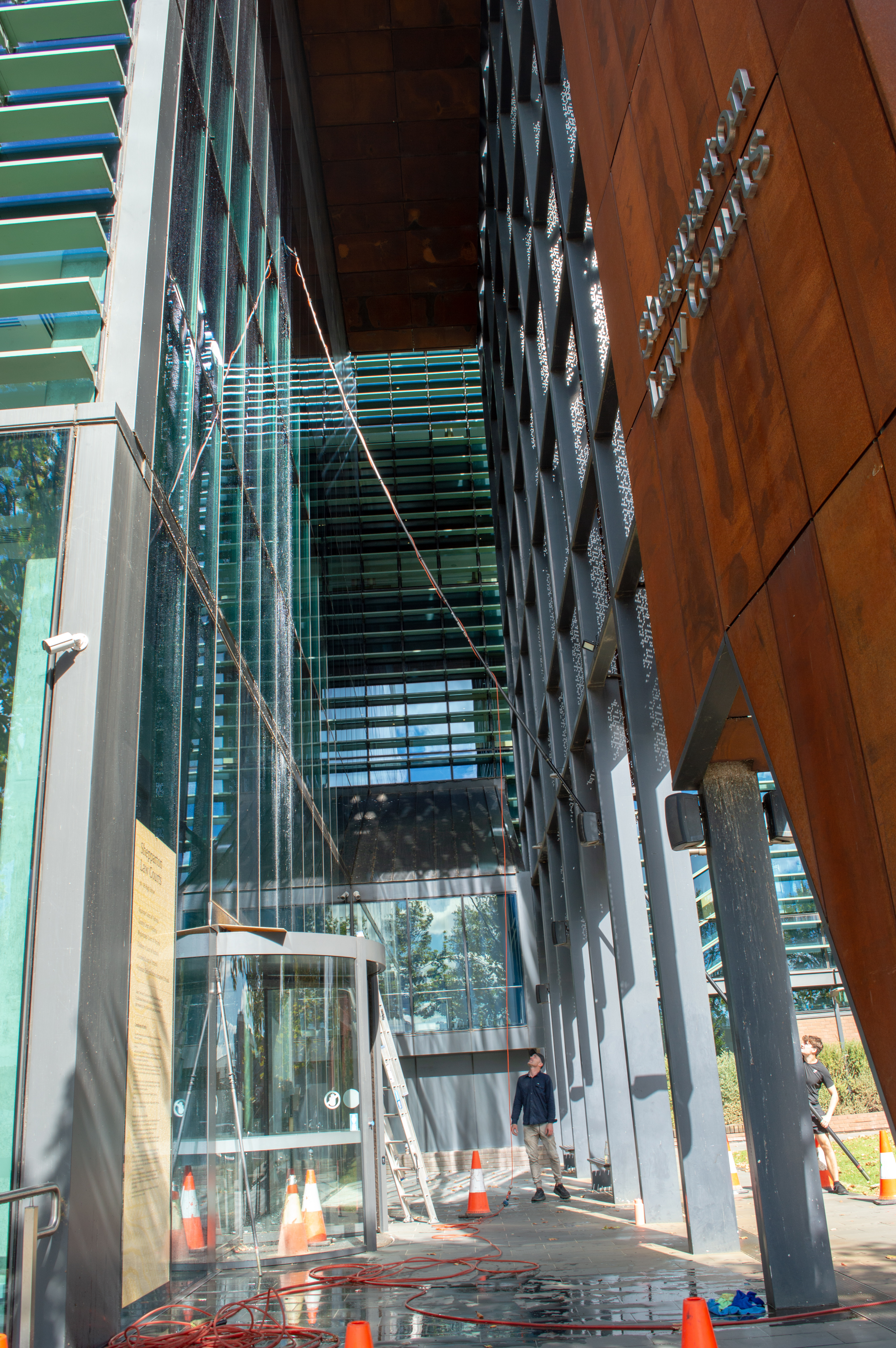
Window cleaning with a water-fed pole in Shepparton, Australia

- Chamois and scrim — Chamois is used to loosen and remove dirt, followed by a buffing with scrim or cheesecloth
- Water and squeegee — Generally, chemicals are added to water, and a device such as a brush or cloth-covered handle is dipped into the resulting solution and used to scrub glass. A squeegee is then used to sluice the dirt and water mixture from the glass. Chemicals added to the solution range from dish soap and glass cleaner to trisodium phosphate and etching salt. In sub-freezing temperatures, anti-freezing chemicals are added to the solution to prevent it from crystallizing on the pane before it is sluiced off.
- Water-fed poles — Any of a variety of types of telescopic poles, fitted at the upper end with a brush and water jets, fed either from vehicle-borne tanks of deionised water or by on-site production of deionised water using a domestic or commercial water outlet. The water is filtered by either a two-stage or three-stage filtration process, involving a carbon filter, and two de-ionization filters, or a carbon filter, a reverse osmosis membrane filter, and a de-ionization resin filter. The filtered water should contain a TDS (total dissolved solids) of 0 ppm (parts per million) when being used on windows. The reason for this is that if using above zero ppm water, reach and wash water-fed pole window cleaners cannot claim to be purified water window cleaners and subsequently, a reading above 0 ppm could lead to spotting on the glass. The amount of spotting would depend entirely on what mineral composition is the water. The brush is used to agitate the debris off the window, while spraying water, and then the brush is lifted a few inches from the glass to rinse the glass with the pure water jets. Fan jets are used for hydrophobic glass, and "pencil" jets are used for hydrophilic glass. The de-ionized water is lacking in ions, so it will pull solids off the glass and dissolve the solids into the water, aiding in the cleaning process. Because there are no solids dissolved in the water, the windows dry clear without water spots. Water-fed poles vary in length. The longest poles are about 70 feet, and can reach up to six storeys. Water-fed cleaning is also referred to as pure water cleaning. It is common in the UK and becoming common in the US.
- Robot or drone

In 2012 John Kimmel invented the water-fed squeegee flipper this combines purified water window washing and a microfiber pad to scrub with a top rinse bar just like water fed brushes but it can also squeegee contaminants that might otherwise be left behind with using a water fed brush.

== Access ==
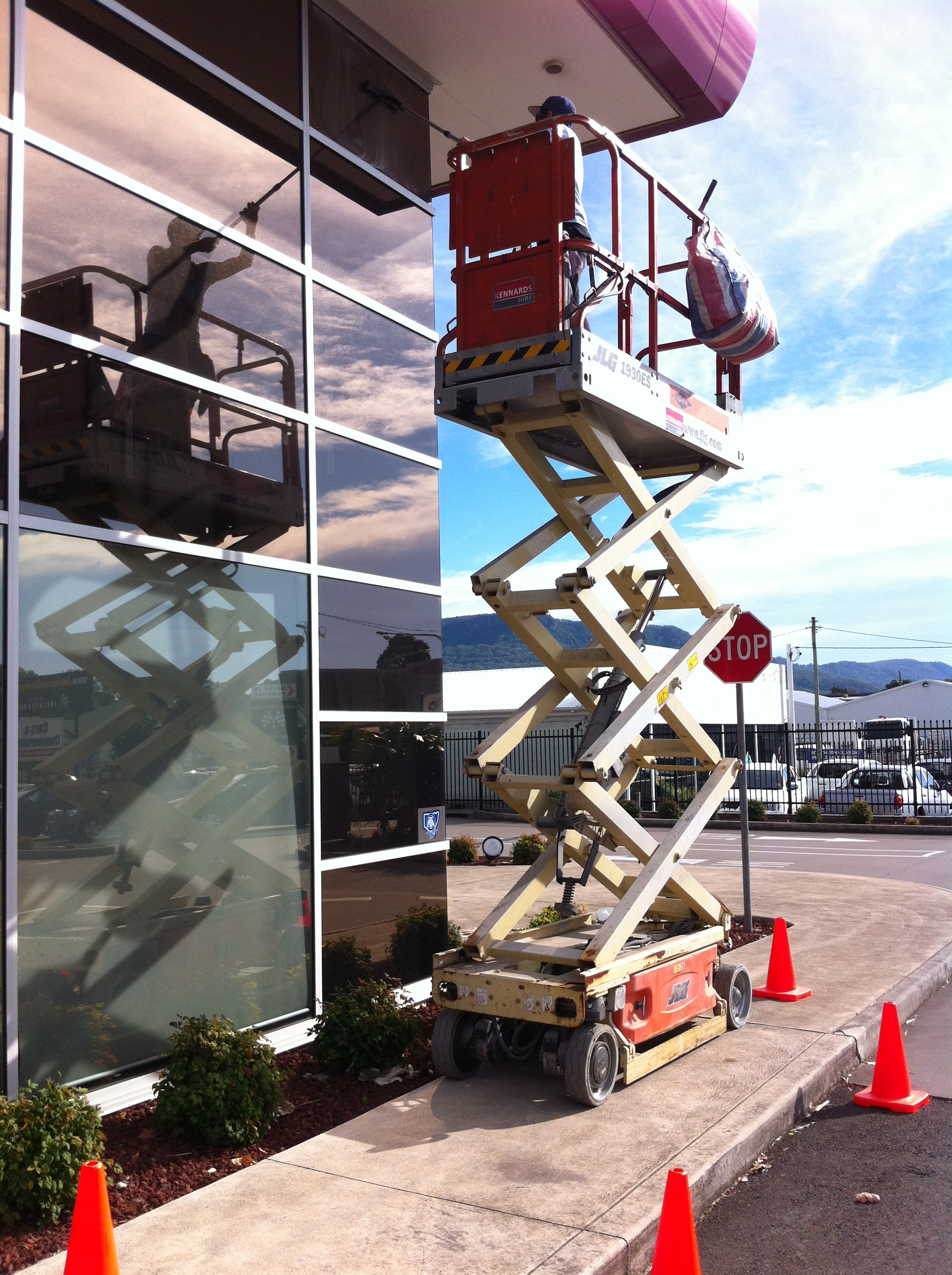
A scissor lift aerial work platform, used to access high windows

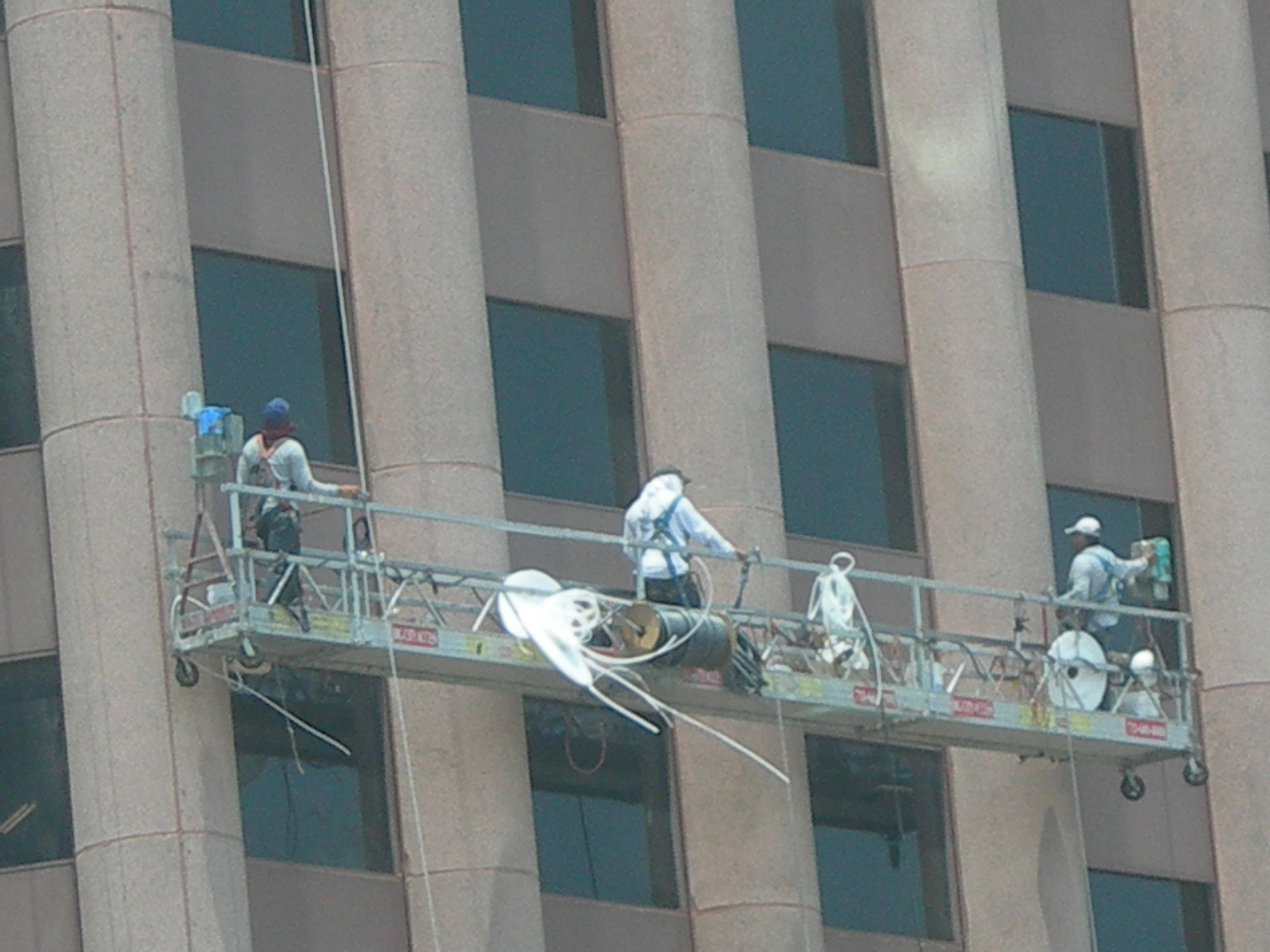
Window cleaning platform, or suspended scaffold, also known as a swing stage

Methods of access and equipment related to both access and cleaning vary nationally and regionally. If a window is not easily accessible using one type of equipment then it is advisable to combine different tools to be able to clean it properly.

- Ladders
- Supported scaffolding — A temporary platform that workers can stand on, which rests on a surface below, rather than hanging from above like suspended scaffolding.
- Aerial work platforms are elevated platforms that workers can stand on, such as a scissor lift, or cherry picker.
- Suspended access equipment — Unlike supported scaffolding, these are not fixed to a lower surface or the ground, but rather are suspended by wire rope from above. They raise and lower the worker either by hand or with a motor. These include:
  - Suspended platform — An access platform for one or more workers with manual or motor driven devices for raising and lowering via rope. Platforms may be fitted to high rise buildings or skyscrapers, or assembled from components to suit architecture and nature of work being performed. These can be either temporary or permanent. Both having their own unique governing codes and regulations. Permanent suspended platforms are called building maintenance units (BMU), window-cleaning cradles (UK) or gondolas (elsewhere in Europe).
  - Bosun’s chair/boatswain’s chair — A single-person seat designed for controlled descent of rope. Often referred to as ‘rope descent systems’ (RDS), these are typically anchored to a roof structure, counterweight configuration, or connecting points designed for the purpose. These are always temporarily installed for the purpose of access. However, their anchor points can be either temporary or permanent.
- Rope Access - using abseiling equipment, consisting of a safety harnesses and rope connections to lower individual window cleaners to positions where they are enabled to clean.

=== Windowsill access ===
Direct access to a window obtained by egress from that window. This method is still used at the Empire State Building in New York City.

== High rise window cleaning ==
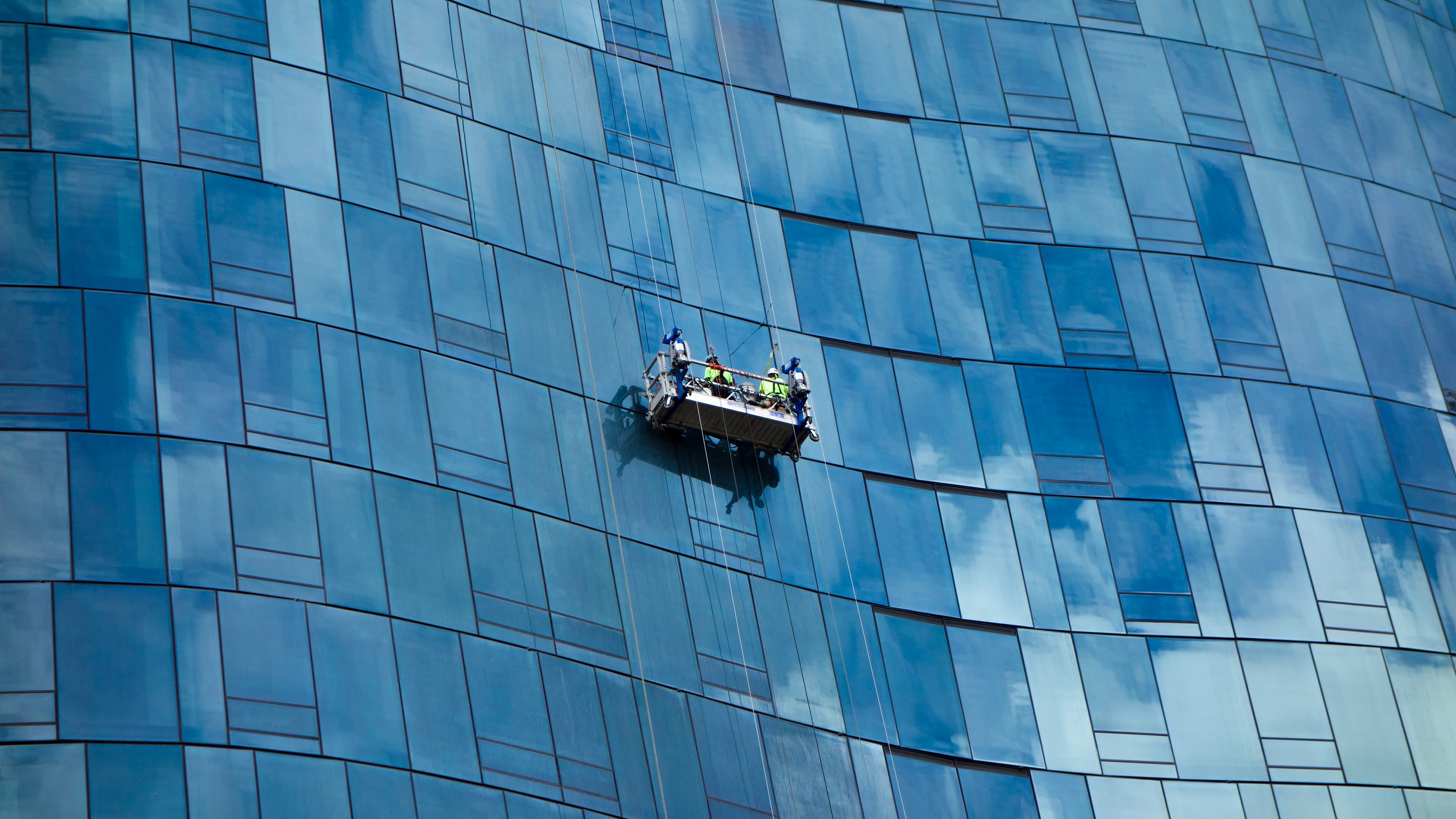
Two window cleaners at work at a building in Hawaii

Windows that needed cleaning became higher as buildings became higher. A trade in window cleaning developed, for instance, in New York City in the late 19th century when early skyscrapers were being built. The height increased the risk to the washers. At first, washers cleaned skyscraper windows by standing on the window ledge and holding onto the frame. Later, leather safety belts attached to anchor bolts were introduced and then scaffolds. For example, the Otis Elevator Company built an electrically operated scaffold for use at Lever House.

Three window cleaners were working at the World Trade Center at the time of the September 11 attacks. Jan Demczur, Polish employee working in the North Tower, survived and helped save five other people who had been trapped in an elevator with him. Roko Camaj and Fabian Soto, working in the South Tower, were killed.

== Hazards ==
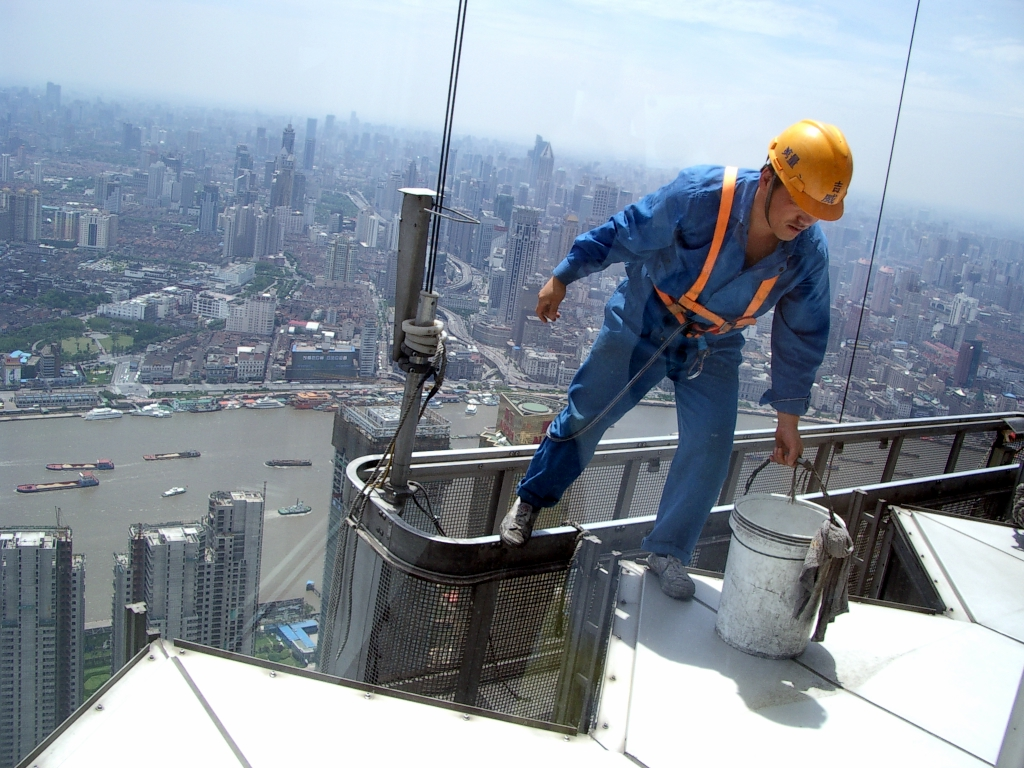
Window cleaner climbing out of a scaffold in Shanghai

Risks include slipping on water or soap, and falling from heights. In 1932 in New York, an average of one out of every two hundred window cleaners were killed per year. On May 29, 1962, four window cleaners were killed when a scaffold fell at the Equitable Life Building. In 1993 Local 32BJ, the New York window cleaners' union, launched an apprentice training program, increasing job safety among its members, although increasing numbers of New York window cleaners are non-unionized.

Unlike in Scotland, there is no government licensing in the United States, England or Wales - this means anyone can claim to be a window cleaner. Window cleaning is considered the most dangerous job in the UK. Several window cleaners die each year, and many are injured.

Many window cleaning businesses are claiming that laws are about to come into force due to European Directive 2001/45/EC that will make ladders illegal for window cleaners. However, the government denies this stipulation, as ladder use for window cleaning is "low risk and short duration":

To clarify the situation HSE is not attempting to ban ladders or stepladders, but ladders should not be the automatic first choice of access. They should only be used after a suitable assessment of the alternatives and the prevailing site conditions. The selection process for access equipment is coming under increasing scrutiny at HSE inspections. This guidance clarifies that for short duration work like window cleaning, provided a number of well-recognised precautions are taken, ladders will remain a common tool for many jobs.

The Working at Height Regulations came into force in 2005 and does not ban ladders but merely restricts their use to safe methods, i.e. foot it by person or with a ladder stopper:

4.2.2. The feet of portable ladders must be prevented from slipping during use by securing the stiles at or near their upper or lower ends, by any anti-slip device or by any other arrangement of equivalent effectiveness. Ladders used for access must be long enough to protrude sufficiently beyond the access platform, unless other measures have been taken to ensure a firm handhold. Interlocking ladders and extension ladders must be used so that the different sections are prevented from moving relative to one another. Mobile ladders must be prevented from moving before they are stepped on.

The HSE favours the use of scaffold towers, i.e. temporary workstations, for window cleaning but says this is rather awkward:

"For some jobs, a mobile elevating work platform will be the best option. However, for many jobs, especially on domestic and small commercial buildings, risk assessment will demonstrate that because of the short duration of the work and features on the building that cannot be altered, ladders are the only realistic option."

Although water fed pole (WFP) systems are meant to be safer than ladders, the Health and Safety Executive has said that they spill large amounts of water which either the window cleaner or their client could slip on.

== Ecology and water shortages ==
Another issue is how "green" window cleaning companies are seen by the public. During the spring of 2006 Defra considered banning the non-essential use of water and extending their already tight restrictions to prevent the use of water-fed safer which reach up to 60 ft. Window cleaners could return to the bucket-and-mop method, because Health and Safety Working at Heights allows such for temporary access. Many window cleaners and window cleaning companies argue that their usage of water is minimal in comparison with water usages of large industry and energy companies, and that their water usage accounts for a small percentage of overall water consumption in developed countries.

== Technological progress and decline in labor requirements ==
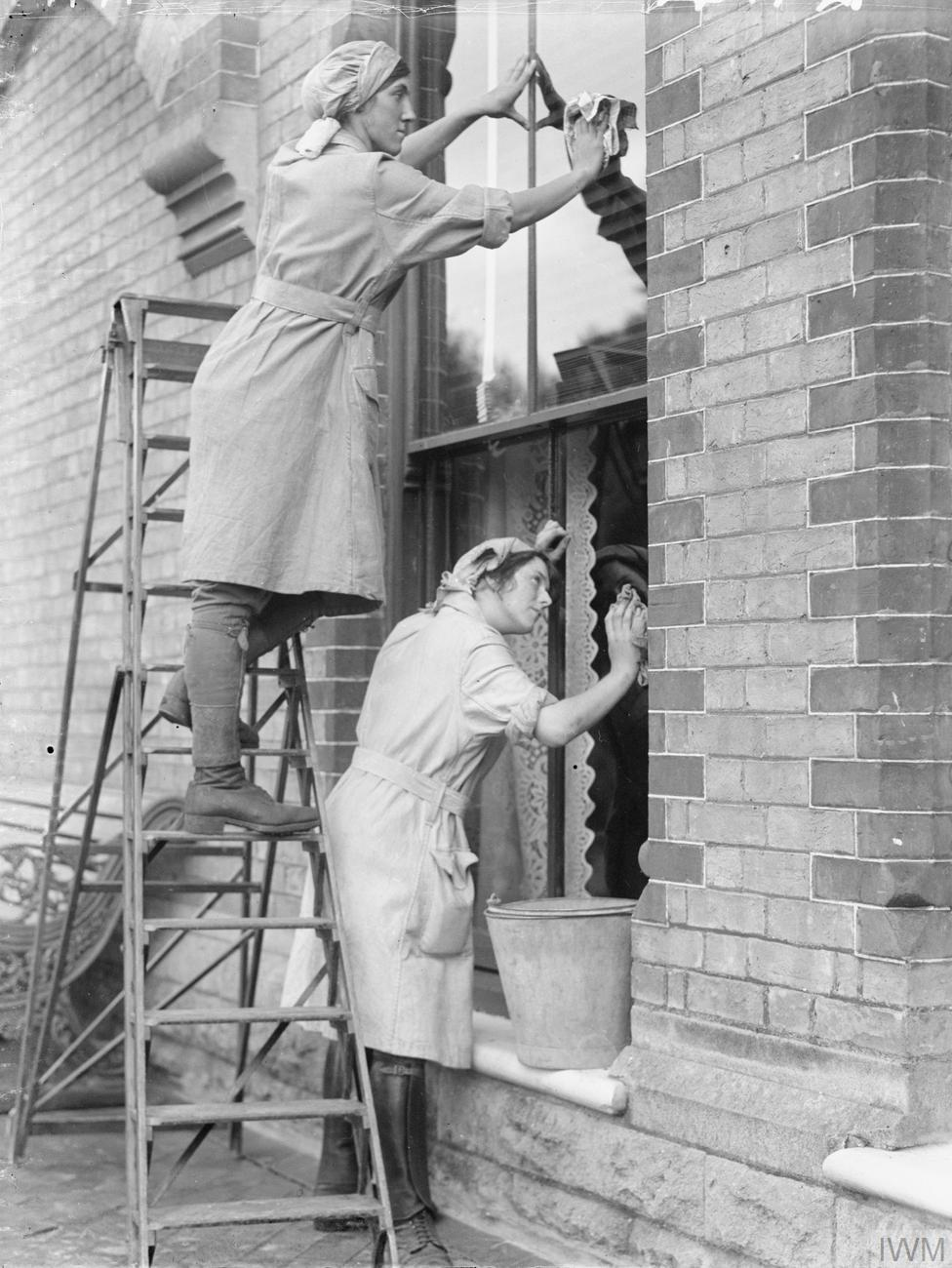
Window cleaners in Britain during World War I

Much progress has been made in the area of minimizing the need for labor in this industry by use of technology. The availability of technology such as the pressure washer has made it more efficient.

More recently, in high tech societies the use of fully automated robotic window cleaners, also for houses, is starting to become common.

== Cultural references ==
Window cleaning and window cleaners are the subject of songs, films and comment, often with comic intent. George Formby's comic song "The Window Cleaner", also known as "When I'm Cleaning Windows", is one of the best known. Films about window cleaners include The Window Cleaner (1968) and Confessions of a Window Cleaner (1978). Journalists sometimes comment on the peculiarities of the trade.

== See also ==
- Green cleaning
