= Pahuichi =

Bolivian and Argentinian hut

Pahuichi photographed by Erland Nordenskiöld in southern Bolivia ca. 1913

Pahuichi, sometimes spelled pagüichi, is a term of uncertain origin used in the Spanish of Bolivia and northern Argentina to refer to a rustic domiciliary structure with a roof made of straw or dried palm fronds.

== History of use ==
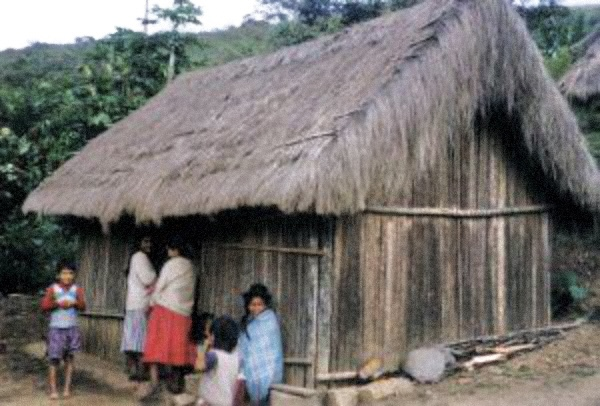
A twenty-first century pahuichi in western Bolivia

The principal Spanish dictionary of the Real Academia Española (RAE) lists pahuichi as a Bolivianism synoymous with the more widely used bohío "hut, simple rustic dwelling," without giving any indication as to the former's etymology. The RAE's dictionary of Americanisms offers slightly more detail, defining pahuichi as a "small house or cottage thatched with leaves (or blades of grass)" and noting the word's use in northern Argentina as well as in Bolivia, but again offers no hypothesis as to the word's origins.

Eastern Bolivian folklorist and philologist Germán Coimbra Sanz hypothesizes that the word represents a borrowing from an unidentified indigenous language of the Chaco and notes its occurrence in newspapers and journal articles published in western Bolivia from at least the 1930s onwards. He further observes that in the later twentieth century pahuichi took on some popularity in Santa Cruz de la Sierra as a name for restaurants and other tourist attractions professing to represent traditional local cuisine and/or customs.
