= Roof cleaning =

Cleaning the top (roof) of a home/building

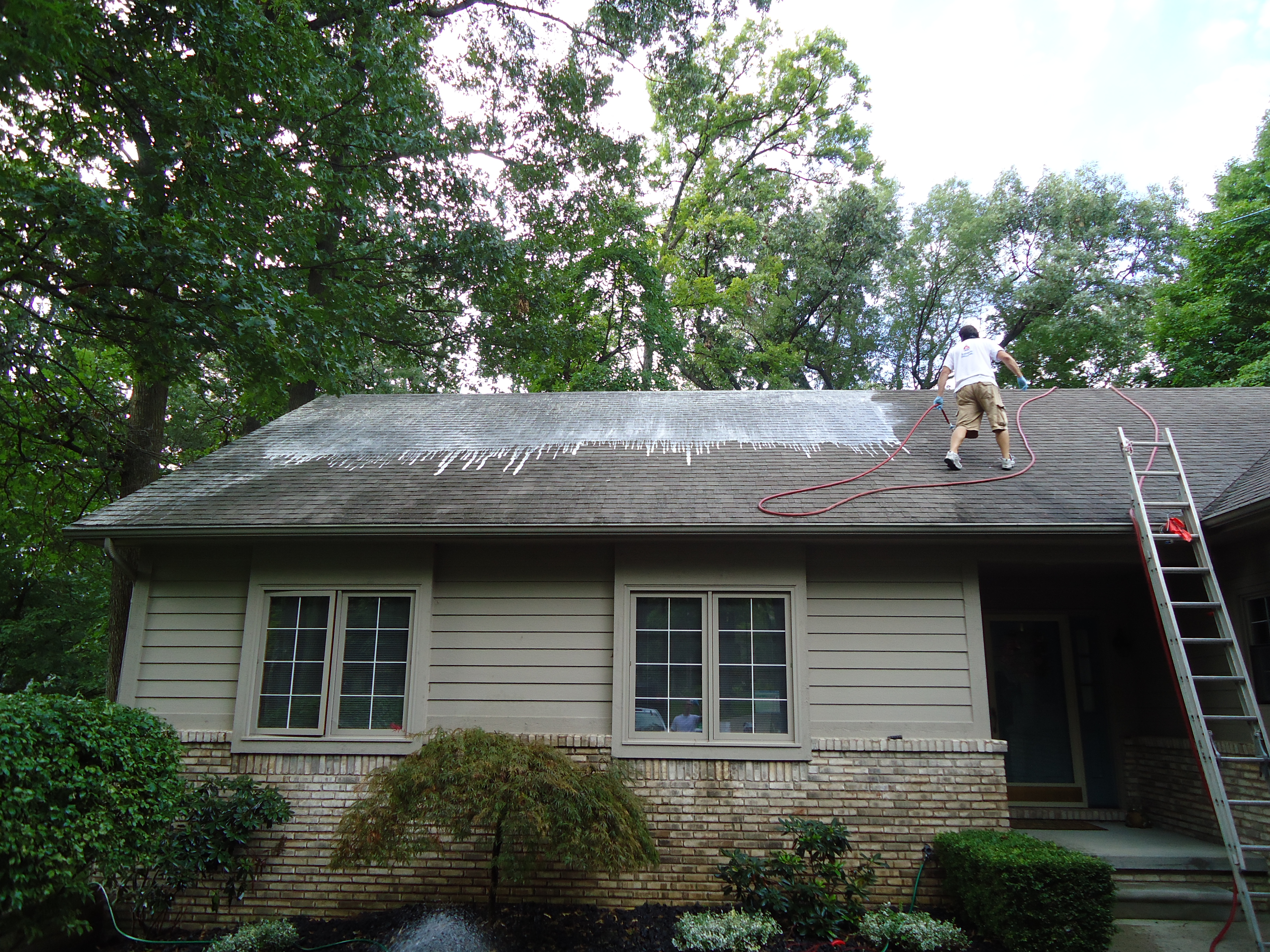
The roof cleaning of fiberglass shingles

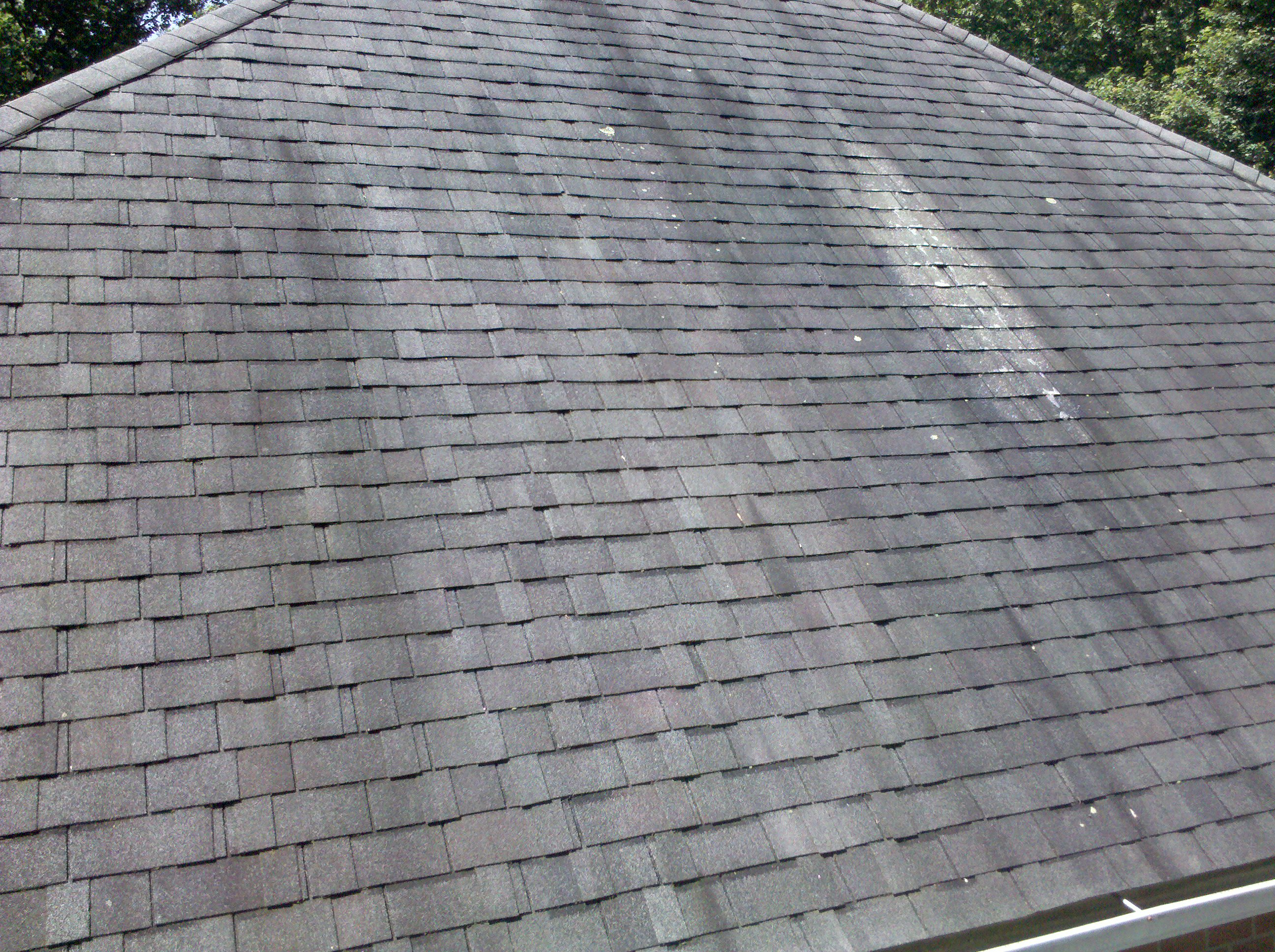
Streaking on a roof

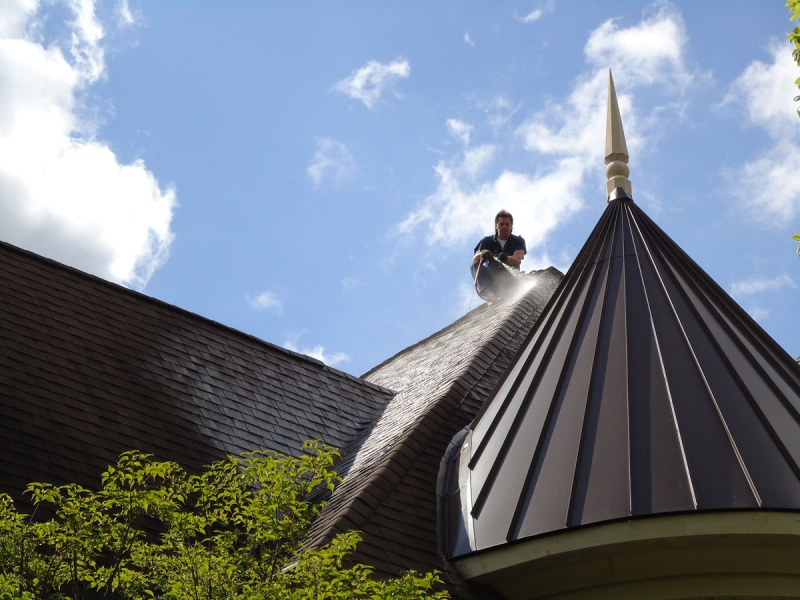
Roof cleaning being performed using a soft-wash system

Roof cleaning is the process of removing algae, mold, mildew, lichen and moss from roofs. Also cleaning oxidation on metal roofs. Cleaning can extend the duration of a roof's ability to function. Algae and other types of build-up often form on the north and west parts of roofs that are shaded or receive less sun, and can reduce a roof's life expectancy. The presence of soot, dirt, or biomass can affect how much sunlight is absorbed by a roof and thus the amount of heat a building absorbs.

Cleaning may be accomplished with a bleach or sodium percarbonate solution, various cleaning products or commercial cleaning services. The Asphalt Roofing Manufacturers Association (ARMA) recommends using a 50/50 solution of household strength sodium hypochlorite (pool chlorine) and water to remove moss and algae. The addition of zinc strips near the roof's peak may reduce the regrowth of algae and moss. Zinc sulfate can also be applied on an annual basis.

== Cleaning apparatus ==
One safe and effective means to clean a roof is an electric agricultural sprayer system, as originally developed in Florida, USA in the early 1990s. The equipment is used to apply a cleaning solution (typically containing bleach) that kills the algae, bacteria, mold, mildew, moss, fungus and other organic organisms growing on the roof. This process is referred to as soft washing. The equipment does not use pressure or mechanical means to clean the roof. Using a pressure washer, or any other gas powered device, to clean a roof at more than 100 PSI can damage the roof. The U.S. based Asphalt Roofing Manufacturers' Association specifies the use of a bleach cleaning solution, without the use of a pressure washer, to remove algae from a roof. ARMA discourages the use of a pressure washer, a flat-surface cleaner or any other mechanical device to clean a roof. Safe, effective soft washing cannot be achieved with a pressure washer, as the Venturi device (downstreaming) cannot achieve sufficient strength of solution to kill the organisms, cleaning the roof. Use of different tips on the pressure washer, so that it drops the pressure down to around 500 psi (3,400 kPa) or less, relies on the pressure of the equipment, and not the chemicals, to clean the roof.

Never use a pressure washer as this may damage the roof. Roof cleaning devices exist that may minimize the spread of airborne radioactive materials (in contaminated areas) and other harmful materials, such as asbestos. Specialized robots have been designed to facilitate cleaning roofs.

== See also ==
- Domestic roof construction
- Roofer
